Asphodelaceae is a family of flowering plants (anthophytes) in the order Asparagales. Such a family has been recognized by most taxonomists, but the circumscription has varied widely. In its current circumscription in the APG IV system, it includes about 40 genera and 900 known species. The type genus is Asphodelus. The family has a wide but scattered distribution throughout the tropics and temperate zones. Many of the species are cultivated as ornamentals. A few are grown commercially for cut flowers.

23,420 species of vascular plant have been recorded in South Africa, making it the sixth most species-rich country in the world and the most species-rich country on the African continent. Of these, 153 species are considered to be threatened. Nine biomes have been described in South Africa: Fynbos, Succulent Karoo, desert, Nama Karoo, grassland, savanna, Albany thickets, the Indian Ocean coastal belt, and forests.

The 2018 South African National Biodiversity Institute's National Biodiversity Assessment plant checklist lists 35,130 taxa in the phyla Anthocerotophyta (hornworts (6)), Anthophyta (flowering plants (33534)), Bryophyta (mosses (685)), Cycadophyta (cycads (42)), Lycopodiophyta (Lycophytes(45)), Marchantiophyta (liverworts (376)), Pinophyta (conifers (33)), and Pteridophyta (cryptogams (408)).

21 genera are represented in the literature. Listed taxa include species, subspecies, varieties, and forms as recorded, some of which have subsequently been allocated to other taxa as synonyms, in which cases the accepted taxon is appended to the listing. Multiple entries under alternative names reflect taxonomic revision over time.

Aloe 
Genus Aloe:
 Aloe aculeata Pole-Evans, indigenous
 Aloe aestivalis Boatwr. & J.C.Manning, accepted as Aloe jeppeae Klopper' & Gideon F.Sm.	
 Aloe affinis A.Berger, endemic
 Aloe africana Mill. endemic
 Aloe albicans Haw. accepted as Tulista marginata (Lam.) G.D.Rowley, indigenous
 Aloe albida (Stapf) Reynolds, indigenous
 Aloe alooides (Bolus) Druten, endemic
 Aloe altilinea (Haw.) Schult. & J.H.Schult. accepted as Haworthia mucronata Haw. var. mucronata	indigenous
 Aloe ammophila Reynolds, endemic
 Aloe angelica Pole-Evans, endemic
 Aloe anomala Haw. accepted as Haworthiopsis venosa (Lam.) G.D.Rowley, indigenous
 Aloe arachnoidea Mill. var. pumila Aiton, accepted as Tulista pumila (L.) G.D.Rowley, indigenous
 Aloe arachnoidea Mill. var. translucens (Haw.) Ker Gawl. accepted as Haworthia herbacea (Mill.) Stearn var. herbacea, indigenous
 Aloe arachnoides Thunb. var. pellucens (Haw.) Salm-Dyck, accepted as Haworthia herbacea (Mill.) Stearn var. herbacea, indigenous
 Aloe arborescens Mill. indigenous
 Aloe arborescens Mill. subsp. mzimnyati Van Jaarsv. & A.E.van Wyk, accepted as Aloe arborescens Mill. indigenous
 Aloe arenicola Reynolds, endemic
 Aloe aristata Haw. Arist, accepted as Aloe aristata (Haw.) Boatwr. & J.C.Manning, indigenous
 Aloe asperiuscula (Haw.) Schult. & J.H.Schult. accepted as Haworthiopsis viscosa (L.) Gildenh. & Klopper var. viscosa, indigenous
 Aloe atrovirens DC. accepted as Haworthia herbacea (Mill.) Stearn var. herbacea, indigenous
 Aloe attenuata Haw. accepted as Haworthiopsis attenuata (Haw.) G.D.Rowley, indigenous
 Aloe attenuata Haw. var. clariperla (Haw.) Salm-Dyck accepted as Haworthiopsis attenuata (Haw.) G.D.Rowley var. attenuata, indigenous
 Aloe bainesii Dyer, accepted as Aloidendron barberae (Dyer) Klopper & Gideon F.Sm.
 Aloe barbara-jeppeae T.A.McCoy & Lavranos, indigenous
 Aloe barberae Dyer, accepted as Aloidendron barberae (Dyer) Klopper & Gideon F.Sm. indigenous
 Aloe barbertoniae Pole-Evans, indigenous
 Aloe barendii Klopper & Gideon F.Sm.	accepted as Aloe bergeriana (Dinter) Boatwr. & J.C.Manning	
 Aloe bergeriana (Dinter) Boatwr. & J.C.Manning, indigenous
 Aloe bicarinata (Haw.) Schult. & J.H.Schult. accepted as × Astrolista bicarinata (Haw.) Molteno & Figueiredo	indigenous
 Aloe bowiea Schult. & J.H.Schult. endemic
 Aloe boylei Baker, accepted as Aloe ecklonis Salm-Dyck
 Aloe braamvanwykii Gideon F.Sm. & Figueiredo, endemic
 Aloe bradlyana Jacq. accepted as Haworthia herbacea (Mill.) Stearn var. herbacea, indigenous
 Aloe branddraaiensis Groenew. endemic
 Aloe brevifolia Mill. endemic
 Aloe brevifolia Mill. var. brevifolia, endemic
 Aloe brevifolia Mill. var. depressa (Haw.) Baker, endemic
 Aloe brevis (Haw.) Schult. & J.H.Schult.  accepted as Tulista minor (Aiton) Gideon F.Sm. & Molteno, indigenous
 Aloe broomii Schonland, indigenous
 Aloe broomii Schonland var. broomii, indigenous
 Aloe broomii Schonland var. tarkaensis Reynolds, endemic
 Aloe buhrii Lavranos, endemic
 Aloe bullulata Jacq. accepted as Astroloba bullulata (Jacq.) Uitewaal, endemic
 Aloe burgersfortensis Reynolds, endemic
 Aloe camperi Schweinf. not indigenous
 Aloe candelabrum A.Berger, endemic
 Aloe castanea Schonland, indigenous
 Aloe chabaudii Schonland, indigenous
 Aloe chabaudii Schonland var. chabaudii, indigenous
 Aloe challisii Van Jaarsv. & A.E.van Wyk, endemic
 Aloe chloracantha (Haw.) Schult. & J.H.Schult. accepted as Haworthia chloracantha Haw. var. chloracantha, indigenous
 Aloe chlorantha Lavranos, endemic
 Aloe chortolirioides A.Berger, indigenous
 Aloe chortolirioides A.Berger var. boastii (Letty) Reynolds, accepted as Aloe chortolirioides A.Berger var. chortolirioides	
 Aloe chortolirioides A.Berger var. chortolirioides, indigenous
 Aloe chortolirioides A.Berger var. woolliana (Pole-Evans) Glen & D.S.Hardy, indigenous
 Aloe ciliaris Haw. accepted as Aloiampelos ciliaris (Haw.) Klopper & Gideon F.Sm. endemic
 Aloe ciliaris Haw. var. ciliaris, accepted as Aloiampelos ciliaris (Haw.) Klopper & Gideon F.Sm. var. ciliaris, endemic
 Aloe ciliaris Haw. var. redacta S.Carter, accepted as Aloiampelos ciliaris (Haw.) Klopper & Gideon F.Sm. var. redacta (S.Carter) Klopper & Gideon F.Sm. endemic
 Aloe ciliaris Haw. var. tidmarshii Schonland, accepted as Aloiampelos ciliaris (Haw.) Klopper & Gideon F.Sm. var. tidmarshii (Schonland) Klopper & Gideon F.Sm. endemic
 Aloe claviflora Burch. indigenous
 Aloe coarctata (Haw.) Schult. & J.H.Schult. accepted as Haworthiopsis coarctata (Haw.) G.D.Rowley, indigenous
 Aloe commixta A.Berger, accepted as Aloiampelos commixta (A.Berger) Klopper & Gideon F.Sm. endemic
 Aloe comosa Marloth & A.Berger, endemic
 Aloe comptonii Reynolds, endemic
 Aloe concinna (Haw.) Schult. & J.H.Schult. accepted as Haworthiopsis viscosa (L.) Gildenh. & Klopper var. viscosa, indigenous
 Aloe congesta Salm-Dyck, accepted as Astroloba congesta (Salm-Dyck) Uitewaal, endemic
 Aloe cooperi Baker, indigenous
 Aloe cooperi Baker subsp. pulchra Glen & D.S.Hardy, accepted as Aloe sharoniae N.R.Crouch & Gideon F.Sm. indigenous
 Aloe cordifolia (Haw.) Schult. & J.H.Schult. accepted as Haworthiopsis viscosa (L.) Gildenh. & Klopper var. viscosa, indigenous
 Aloe craibii Gideon F.Sm. endemic
 Aloe cryptopoda Baker, indigenous
 Aloe cymbiformis Haw. accepted as Haworthia cymbiformis (Haw.) Duval var. cymbiformis, indigenous
 Aloe dabenorisana Van Jaarsv. endemic
 Aloe denticulata (Haw.) Schult. & J.H.Schult. accepted as Haworthia aristata Haw. indigenous
 Aloe dewetii Reynolds, indigenous
 Aloe dichotoma Masson, accepted as Aloidendron dichotomum (Masson) Klopper & Gideon F.Sm. indigenous
 Aloe dichotoma Masson subsp. pillansii (L.Guthrie) Zonn. accepted as Aloidendron pillansii (L.Guthrie) Klopper & Gideon F.Sm.	
 Aloe dichotoma Masson subsp. ramosissima (Pillans) Zonn.	accepted as Aloidendron ramosissimum (Pillans) Klopper & Gideon F.Sm.	
 Aloe dichotoma Masson var. ramosissima (Pillans) Glen & D.S.Hardy, accepted as Aloidendron ramosissimum (Pillans) Klopper & Gideon F.Sm. indigenous
 Aloe dinteri A.Berger, accepted as Gonialoe dinteri (A.Berger) Boatwr. & J.C.Manning	
 Aloe distans Haw. endemic
 Aloe dolomitica Groenew. accepted as Aloe vryheidensis Groenew.
 Aloe dominella Reynolds, indigenous
 Aloe dyeri Schonland, indigenous
 Aloe ecklonis Salm-Dyck, indigenous
 Aloe erecta (Haw.) Salm-Dyck, accepted as Tulista pumila (L.) G.D.Rowley, indigenous
 Aloe erecta (Haw.) Salm-Dyck var. laetevirens Salm-Dyck, accepted as Tulista pumila (L.) G.D.Rowley, indigenous
 Aloe erecta (Haw.) Schult. & J.H.Schult. accepted as Tulista minor (Aiton) Gideon F.Sm. & Molteno, indigenous
 Aloe excelsa A.Berger, indigenous
 Aloe excelsa A.Berger var. excelsa, indigenous
 Aloe falcata Baker, endemic
 Aloe fasciata (Willd.) Salm-Dyck, accepted as Haworthiopsis fasciata (Willd.) G.D.Rowley, indigenous
 Aloe fasciata (Willd.) Salm-Dyck var. major Salm-Dyck, accepted as Haworthiopsis fasciata (Willd.) G.D.Rowley var. fasciata, indigenous
 Aloe fasciata (Willd.) Salm-Dyck var. minor Salm-Dyck, accepted as Haworthiopsis fasciata (Willd.) G.D.Rowley var. fasciata, indigenous
 Aloe ferox Mill. indigenous
 Aloe foliolosa Haw. accepted as Astroloba foliolosa (Haw.) Uitewaal, endemic
 Aloe fosteri Pillans, indigenous
 Aloe fouriei D.S.Hardy & Glen, endemic
 Aloe framesii L.Bolus, endemic
 Aloe gariepensis Pillans, indigenous
 Aloe gariusana Dinter, accepted as Aloe gariepensis Pillans	
 Aloe gerstneri Reynolds, endemic
 Aloe glabrata Salm-Dyck, Haworthiopsis attenuata (Haw.) G.D.Rowley var. glabrata (Salm-Dyck) G.D.Rowley, indigenous
 Aloe glabrata Salm-Dyck var. concolor Salm-Dyck, accepted as Haworthiopsis attenuata (Haw.) G.D.Rowley var. glabrata (Salm-Dyck) G.D.Rowley, indigenous
 Aloe glabrata Salm-Dyck var. perviridis Salm-Dyck, accepted as Haworthiopsis attenuata (Haw.) G.D.Rowley var. glabrata (Salm-Dyck) G.D.Rowley
 Aloe glauca Mill. endemic
 Aloe glauca Mill. var. muricata (Schult.) Baker. accepted as Aloe glauca Mill.
 Aloe globuligemma Pole-Evans, indigenous
 Aloe gracilis Haw. accepted as Aloiampelos gracilis (Haw.) Klopper & Gideon F.Sm. endemic
 Aloe granata (Willd.) Schult. & J.H.Schult. accepted as Tulista minor (Aiton) Gideon F.Sm. & Molteno, indigenous
 Aloe grandidentata Salm-Dyck, indigenous
 Aloe greatheadii Schonland, indigenous
 Aloe greatheadii Schonland var. davyana (Schonland) Glen & D.S.Hardy, indigenous
 Aloe greatheadii Schonland var. greatheadii, indigenous
 Aloe greenii Baker, indigenous
 Aloe haemanthifolia A.Berger & Marloth, accepted as Kumara haemanthifolia (A.Berger & Marloth) Boatwr. & J.C.Manning, endemic
 Aloe hahnii Gideon F.Sm. & Klopper, endemic
 Aloe hardyi Glen, endemic
 Aloe herbacea DC. accepted as Haworthia reticulata (Haw.) Haw. var. reticulata, indigenous
 Aloe herbacea Mill. accepted as Haworthia herbacea (Mill.) Stearn var. herbacea, indigenous
 Aloe hereroensis Engl. indigenous
 Aloe hereroensis Engl. var. hereroensis, indigenous
 Aloe hlangapies Groenew. accepted as Aloe ecklonis Salm-Dyck
 Aloe humilis (L.) Mill. endemic
 Aloe immaculata Pillans, endemic
 Aloe inconspicua Plowes, endemic
 Aloe integra Reynolds, indigenous
 Aloe jeppeae Klopper & Gideon F.Sm. indigenous
 Aloe kamnelii Van Jaarsv. endemic
 Aloe keithii Reynolds, accepted as Aloe parvibracteata Schonland	
 Aloe khamiesensis Pillans, endemic
 Aloe knersvlakensis S.J.Marais, endemic
 Aloe kniphofioides Baker, indigenous
 Aloe komatiensis Reynolds, indigenous
 Aloe kouebokkeveldensis Van Jaarsv. & A.B.Low, endemic
 Aloe krapohliana Marloth, endemic
 Aloe kraussii Baker, indigenous
 Aloe laevigata Schult. & J.H.Schult. accepted as Tulista marginata (Lam.) G.D.Rowley, indigenous
 Aloe laxissima Reynolds, Aloe zebrina Baker
 Aloe lettyae Reynolds, endemic
 Aloe linearifolia A.Berger, mindigenous
 Aloe lineata (Aiton) Haw. endemic
 Aloe lineata (Aiton) Haw. var. lineata, endemic
 Aloe lineata (Aiton) Haw. var. muirii (Marloth) Reynolds, endemic
 Aloe littoralis Baker, indigenous
 Aloe longistyla Baker, endemic
 Aloe lutescens Groenew. indigenous
 Aloe maculata All. indigenous
 Aloe maculata All. subsp. ficksburgensis (Reynolds) Gideon F.Sm. indigenous
 Aloe maculata All. subsp. maculata, indigenous
 Aloe margaritifera (L.) Burm.f. accepted as Tulista pumila (L.) G.D.Rowley, indigenous
 Aloe margaritifera (L.) Burm.f. var. major Ait. accepted as Tulista minor (Aiton) Gideon F.Sm. & Molteno, indigenous
 Aloe margaritifera (L.) Burm.f. var. maxima Haw. accepted as Tulista pumila (L.) G.D.Rowley, indigenous
 Aloe margaritifera (L.) Burm.f. var. media DC. accepted as Tulista minor (Aiton) Gideon F.Sm. & Molteno, indigenous
 Aloe margaritifera (L.) Burm.f. var. minima Aiton, accepted as Tulista minor (Aiton) Gideon F.Sm. & Molteno, indigenous
 Aloe margaritifera (L.) Burm.f. var. minor Aiton, accepted as Tulista minor (Aiton) Gideon F.Sm. & Molteno, indigenous
 Aloe marginata Lam.  accepted as Tulista marginata (Lam.) G.D.Rowley, endemic
 Aloe marlothii A.Berger, indigenous
 Aloe marlothii A.Berger subsp. marlothii, indigenous
 Aloe marlothii A.Berger subsp. orientalis Glen & D.S.Hardy, indigenous
 Aloe melanacantha A.Berger, indigenous
 Aloe meyeri Van Jaarsv. indigenous
 Aloe micracantha Haw. endemic
 Aloe microstigma Salm-Dyck, indigenous
 Aloe microstigma Salm-Dyck subsp. framesii (L.Bolus) Glen & D.S.Hardy, accepted as Aloe framesii L.Bolus, endemic
 Aloe minima Baker, indigenous
 Aloe minor (Aiton) Schult. & J.H.Schult. accepted as Tulista minor (Aiton) Gideon F.Sm. & Molteno, indigenous
 Aloe mirabilis Haw. accepted as Haworthia mirabilis (Haw.) Haw. var. mirabilis, indigenous
 Aloe mitriformis Mill. endemic
 Aloe modesta Reynolds, endemic
 Aloe monotropa I.Verd. endemic
 Aloe mudenensis Reynolds, indigenous
 Aloe mutabilis Pillans, indigenous
 Aloe mutans Reynolds, indigenous
 Aloe myriacantha (Haw.) Schult. & J.H.Schult. indigenous
 Aloe neilcrouchii Klopper & Gideon F.Sm. endemic
 Aloe nicholsii Gideon F.Sm. & N.R.Crouch, endemic
 Aloe nigra (Haw.) Schult. & J.H.Schult. accepted as Haworthiopsis nigra (Haw.) G.D.Rowley, indigenous
 Aloe nubigena Groenew. endemic
 Aloe pallida (Haw.) Schult. & J.H.Schult. accepted as Haworthia herbacea (Mill.) Stearn var. herbacea, indigenous
 Aloe papillosa Salm-Dyck, accepted as Tulista pumila (L.) G.D.Rowley, indigenous
 Aloe parva (Haw.) Schult. & J.H.Schult. accepted as Haworthiopsis tessellata (Haw.) G.D.Rowley var. tessellata, indigenous
 Aloe parvibracteata Schonland, indigenous
 Aloe parvibracteata Schonland var. zuluensis (Reynolds) Reynolds, Aloe parvibracteata Schonland, indigenous
 Aloe pearsonii Schonland, indigenous
 Aloe peglerae Schonland, endemic
 Aloe perfoliata L. endemic
 Aloe petricola Pole-Evans, endemic
 Aloe petrophila Pillans, endemic
 Aloe pictifolia D.S.Hardy, endemic
 Aloe pienaarii Pole-Evans, indigenous
 Aloe pillansii L.Guthrie, accepted as Aloidendron pillansii (L.Guthrie) Klopper & Gideon F.Sm. indigenous
 Aloe planifolia (Haw.) Salm-Dyck, accepted as Haworthia cymbiformis (Haw.) Duval var. cymbiformis, indigenous
 Aloe planifolia (Haw.) Schult. & J.H.Schult.  accepted as Haworthia cymbiformis (Haw.) Duval var. cymbiformis, indigenous
 Aloe plicatilis (L.) Burm.f. accepted as Kumara plicatilis (L.) G.D.Rowley	
 Aloe plicatilis (L.) Mill. accepted as Kumara plicatilis (L.) G.D.Rowley, endemic
 Aloe pluridens Haw. endemic
 Aloe pongolensis Reynolds, accepted as Aloe parvibracteata Schonland, indigenous
 Aloe pongolensis Reynolds var. zuluensis Reynolds, accepted as Aloe parvibracteata Schonland, indigenous
 Aloe pratensis Baker, indigenous
 Aloe pretoriensis Pole-Evans, indigenous
 Aloe prinslooi I.Verd. & D.S.Hardy, endemic
 Aloe pruinosa Reynolds, endemic
 Aloe pseudotortuosa Salm-Dyck, accepted as Haworthiopsis viscosa (L.) Gildenh. & Klopper var. viscosa, indigenous
 Aloe pumila (Aiton) Haw. accepted as Tulista pumila (L.) G.D.Rowley, indigenous
 Aloe pumila L. accepted as Tulista pumila (L.) G.D.Rowley, indigenous
 Aloe pumila L. var. arachnoidea L. accepted as Haworthia arachnoidea (L.) Duval var. arachnoidea indigenous
 Aloe pumila L. var. margaritifera L. accepted as Tulista pumila (L.) G.D.Rowley, indigenous
 Aloe pumila L. var. y L. accepted as Tulista minor (Aiton) Gideon F.Sm. & Molteno, indigenous
 Aloe pumilio Jacq. accepted as Haworthia reticulata (Haw.) Haw. var. reticulata, indigenous
 Aloe radula Jacq. accepted as Haworthiopsis attenuata (Haw.) G.D.Rowley var. radula (Jacq.) G.D.Rowley, indigenous
 Aloe radula Jacq. var. major Salm-Dyck, accepted as Haworthiopsis attenuata (Haw.) G.D.Rowley var. radula (Jacq.) G.D.Rowley, indigenous
 Aloe radula Jacq. var. media Salm-Dyck, accepted as Haworthiopsis attenuata (Haw.) G.D.Rowley var. radula (Jacq.) G.D.Rowley
 Aloe radula Jacq. var. minor Salm-Dyck, accepted as Haworthiopsis attenuata (Haw.) G.D.Rowley var. radula (Jacq.) G.D.Rowley, indigenous
 Aloe ramosissima Pillans accepted as Aloidendron ramosissimum (Pillans) Klopper & Gideon F.Sm. indigenous
 Aloe recurva Haw. accepted as Haworthiopsis venosa (Lam.) G.D.Rowley, indigenous
 Aloe reinwardtii Salm-Dyck, accepted as Haworthiopsis reinwardtii (Salm-Dyck) G.D.Rowley, indigenous
 Aloe reitzii Reynolds, endemic
 Aloe reitzii Reynolds var. reitzii, endemic
 Aloe reitzii Reynolds var. vernalis D.S.Hardy, endemic
 Aloe reticulata Haw. accepted as Haworthia reticulata (Haw.) Haw. var. reticulata, indigenous
 Aloe retusa L. accepted as Haworthia retusa (L.) Duval var. retusa, indigenous
 Aloe reynoldsii Letty, endemic
 Aloe rubriflora (L.Bolus) G.D.Rowley, accepted as Astroloba rubriflora (L.Bolus) Gideon F.Sm. & J.C.Manning, indigenous
 Aloe rugosa Salm-Dyck, accepted as Haworthiopsis attenuata (Haw.) G.D.Rowley var. attenuata, indigenous
 Aloe rugosa Salm-Dyck var. laetevirens Salm-Dyck, accepted as Haworthiopsis attenuata (Haw.) G.D.Rowley var. attenuata, indigenous
 Aloe rugosa Salm-Dyck var. perviridis Salm-Dyck, accepted as Haworthiopsis attenuata (Haw.) G.D.Rowley var. attenuata, indigenous
 Aloe rupestris Baker, indigenous
 Aloe saundersiae (Reynolds) Reynolds, endemic
 Aloe scabra (Haw.) Schult. & J.H.Schult. accepted as Haworthiopsis scabra (Haw.) G.D.Rowley, indigenous
 Aloe semiglabrata (Haw.) Schult. & J.H.Schult. accepted as Tulista pumila (L.) G.D.Rowley, indigenous
 Aloe semimargaritifera Salm-Dyck, accepted as Tulista pumila (L.) G.D.Rowley, indigenous
 Aloe semimargaritifera Salm-Dyck var. maxima (Haw.) Salm-Dyck, accepted as Tulista pumila (L.) G.D.Rowley, indigenous
 Aloe sessiliflora Pole-Evans, accepted as Aloe spicata L.f.
 Aloe setosa Schult. & J.H.Schult. accepted as Haworthia arachnoidea (L.) Duval var. setata (Haw.) M.B.Bayer, indigenous
 Aloe sharoniae N.R.Crouch & Gideon F.Sm. indigenous
 Aloe simii Pole-Evans, endemic
 Aloe sladeniana Pole-Evans, accepted as Gonialoe sladeniana (Pole-Evans) Boatwr. & J.C.Manning	
 Aloe sordida (Haw.) Schult. & J.H.Schult. accepted as Haworthiopsis sordida (Haw.) G.D.Rowley, indigenous
 Aloe soutpansbergensis I.Verd. endemic
 Aloe speciosa Baker, endemic
 Aloe spectabilis Reynolds, endemic
 Aloe spicata L.f. indigenous
 Aloe spiralis L. accepted as Astroloba spiralis (L.) Uitewaal, indigenous
 Aloe stenophylla Schult. & J.H.Schult. accepted as Haworthia angustifolia Haw. var. angustifolia, indigenous
 Aloe striata Haw. endemic
 Aloe striata Haw. subsp. karasbergensis (Pillans) Glen & D.S.Hardy, avvepted as Aloe karasbergensis Pillans, indigenous
 Aloe striata Haw. subsp. komaggasensis (Kritz. & Van Jaarsv.) Glen & D.S.Hardy, Aloe komaggasensis Kritz. & Van Jaarsv. endemic
 Aloe striatula Haw. accepted as Aloiampelos striatula (Haw.) Klopper & Gideon F.Sm. indigenous
 Aloe striatula Haw. var. caesia Reynolds, accepted as Aloiampelos striatula (Haw.) Klopper & Gideon F.Sm. var. caesia (Reynolds) Klopper & Gideon F.Sm. endemic
 Aloe subfasciata Salm-Dyck, accepted as Haworthiopsis fasciata (Willd.) G.D.Rowley var. fasciata indigenous
 Aloe subspicata (Baker) Boatwr. & J.C.Manning, indigenous
 Aloe subtortuosa Schult. & J.H.Schult. accepted as Haworthiopsis viscosa (L.) Gildenh. & Klopper var. viscosa, indigenous
 Aloe subulata Salm-Dyck, accepted as Haworthiopsis attenuata (Haw.) G.D.Rowley var. attenuata, indigenous
 Aloe succotrina Lam. endemic
 Aloe suffulta Reynolds, indigenous
 Aloe suprafoliata Pole-Evans, indigenous
 Aloe tenuifolia (Engl.) Boatwr. & J.C.Manning, accepted as Aloe bergeriana (Dinter) Boatwr. & J.C.Manning	
 Aloe tenuior Haw. Aloiampelos tenuior (Haw.) Klopper & Gideon F.Sm. endemic
 Aloe tessellata (Haw.) Schult. & J.H.Schult. accepted as Haworthiopsis tessellata (Haw.) G.D.Rowley, indigenous
 Aloe thompsoniae Groenew. endemic
 Aloe thorncroftii Pole-Evans, endemic
 Aloe thraskii Baker, endemic
 Aloe tongaensis Van Jaarsv. accepted as Aloidendron tongaensis (Van Jaarsv.) Klopper & Gideon F.Sm. indigenous
 Aloe torquata (Haw.) Schult. & Schult.f. accepted as Haworthiopsis viscosa (L.) Gildenh. & Klopper var. viscosa, indigenous
 Aloe translucens Haw. accepted as Haworthia herbacea (Mill.) Stearn var. herbacea, indigenous
 Aloe transvaalensis Kuntze, indigenous
 Aloe tricolor Haw. accepted as Haworthiopsis venosa (Lam.) G.D.Rowley, indigenous
 Aloe umfoloziensis Reynolds, indigenous
 Aloe vanbalenii Pillans, indigenous
 Aloe vandermerwei Reynolds, endemic
 Aloe vanrooyenii Gideon F.Sm. & N.R.Crouch, endemic
 Aloe variegata L. Gonialoe variegata (L.) Boatwr. & J.C.Manning, indigenous
 Aloe variegata L. var. haworthii A.Berger, accepted as Gonialoe variegata (L.) Boatwr. & J.C.Manning	
 Aloe venosa Lam. accepted as Haworthiopsis venosa (Lam.) G.D.Rowley, indigenous
 Aloe verdoorniae Reynolds, indigenous
 Aloe verecunda Pole-Evans, endemic
 Aloe virescens (Haw.) Schult. & J.H.Schult. accepted as Tulista marginata (Lam.) G.D.Rowley, indigenous
 Aloe viscosa L. accepted as Haworthiopsis viscosa (L.) Gildenh. & Klopper, indigenous
 Aloe viscosa L. var. indurata (Haw.) Salm-Dyck, accepted as Haworthiopsis viscosa (L.) Gildenh. & Klopper var. viscosa, indigenous
 Aloe vogtsii Reynolds, endemic
 Aloe vossii Reynolds, endemic
 Aloe vryheidensis Groenew. endemic
 Aloe wickensii Pole-Evans, indigenous
 Aloe zebrina Baker, indigenous

Aloiampelos 
Genus Aloiampelos:
 Aloiampelos ciliaris (Haw.) Klopper & Gideon F.Sm. endemic
 Aloiampelos ciliaris (Haw.) Klopper & Gideon F.Sm. var. ciliaris endemic
 Aloiampelos ciliaris (Haw.) Klopper & Gideon F.Sm. var. redacta (S.Carter) Klopper & Gideon F.Sm. endemic
 Aloiampelos ciliaris (Haw.) Klopper & Gideon F.Sm. var. tidmarshii (Schonland) Klopper & Gideon F.Sm. endemic
 Aloiampelos commixta (A.Berger) Klopper & Gideon F.Sm. endemic
 Aloiampelos decumbens (Reynolds) Klopper & Gideon F.Sm. endemic
 Aloiampelos gracilis (Haw.) Klopper & Gideon F.Sm. endemic
 Aloiampelos juddii (Van Jaarsv.) Klopper & Gideon F.Sm. endemic
 Aloiampelos striatula (Haw.) Klopper & Gideon F.Sm. indigenous
 Aloiampelos striatula (Haw.) Klopper & Gideon F.Sm. var. caesia (Reynolds) Klopper & Gideon F.Sm. endemic
 Aloiampelos striatula (Haw.) Klopper & Gideon F.Sm. var. striatula, indigenous
 Aloiampelos tenuior (Haw.) Klopper & Gideon F.Sm. endemic

Aloidendron 
Genus Aloidendron:
 Aloidendron barberae (Dyer) Klopper & Gideon F.Sm. indigenous
 Aloidendron dichotomum (Masson) Klopper & Gideon F.Sm. near endemic
 Aloidendron pillansii (L.Guthrie) Klopper & Gideon F.Sm. near endemic
 Aloidendron ramosissimum (Pillans) Klopper & Gideon F.Sm. near endemic
 Aloidendron tongaensis (Van Jaarsv.) Klopper & Gideon F.Sm. indigenous

Apicra 
Genus  Apicra:
 Apicra anomala (Haw.) Willd. accepted as Haworthiopsis venosa (Lam.) G.D.Rowley, indigenous
 Apicra arachnoidea (L.) Willd. accepted as Haworthia arachnoidea (L.) Duval var. arachnoidea, indigenous
 Apicra attenuata (Haw.) Willd. accepted as Haworthiopsis attenuata (Haw.) G.D.Rowley, indigenous
 Apicra bicarinata Haw. accepted as × Astrolista bicarinata (Haw.) Molteno & Figueiredo, endemic
 Apicra fasciata Willd. accepted as Haworthiopsis fasciata (Willd.) G.D.Rowley, indigenous
 Apicra granata Willd. accepted as Tulista minor (Aiton) Gideon F.Sm. & Molteno, indigenous
 Apicra jacobseniana Poelln. accepted as Astroloba rubriflora (L.Bolus) Gideon F.Sm. & J.C.Manning, indigenous
 Apicra minor (Aiton) Steud. accepted as Tulista minor (Aiton) Gideon F.Sm. & Molteno, indigenous
 Apicra nigra Haw. accepted as Haworthiopsis nigra (Haw.) G.D.Rowley, indigenous
 Apicra radula (Jacq.) Willd. accepted as Haworthiopsis attenuata (Haw.) G.D.Rowley var. radula (Jacq.) G.D.Rowley, indigenous
 Apicra rubriflora L.Bolus, accepted as Astroloba rubriflora (L.Bolus) Gideon F.Sm. & J.C.Manning, indigenous
 Apicra skinneri A.Berger, accepted as × Astrolista bicarinata (Haw.) Molteno & Figueiredo, indigenous

Aristaloe 
Genus  Aristaloe:
 Aristaloe aristata (Haw.) Boatwr. & J.C.Manning, indigenous

Asphodelus 
Genus  Asphodelus:
 Asphodelus fistulosus L. not indigenous, invasive

Astroloba 
Genus  Astroloba:
 Astroloba bicarinata (Haw.) Uitewaal, accepted as × Astrolista bicarinata (Haw.) Molteno & Figueiredo, indigenous
 Astroloba bullulata (Jacq.) Uitewaal, endemic
 Astroloba congesta (Salm-Dyck) Uitewaal, endemic
 Astroloba corrugata N.L.Mey. & Gideon F.Sm. endemic
 Astroloba cremnophila Van Jaarsv. endemic
 Astroloba foliolosa (Haw.) Uitewaal, endemic
 Astroloba herrei Uitewaal, endemic
 Astroloba pentagona (Haw.) Uitewaal (="hallii" nom. nud.), endemic 
 Astroloba robusta P.Reineke ex Molteno, Van Jaarsv. & Gideon F.Sm. endemic
 Astroloba rubriflora (L.Bolus) Gideon F.Sm. & J.C.Manning, endemic
 Astroloba skinneri (A.Berger) Uitewaal, accepted as × Astrolista bicarinata (Haw.) Molteno & Figueiredo, indigenous
 Astroloba spirella (Haw.) Molteno & Gideon F.Sm. (="smutsiana" nom. nud.), endemic 
 Astroloba spiralis (L.) Uitewaal, endemic
 Astroloba tenax Molteno, Van Jaarsv. & Gideon F.Sm. endemic
 Astroloba tenax Molteno, Van Jaarsv. & Gideon F.Sm. var. moltenoi Gideon F.Sm. & Van Jaarsv. endemic
 Astroloba tenax Molteno, Van Jaarsv. & Gideon F.Sm. var. tenax, endemic

Bulbine 
Genus  Bulbine:
 Bulbine abyssinica A.Rich. indigenous
 Bulbine alba Van Jaarsv. accepted as Bulbine triebneri Dinter, endemic
 Bulbine alooides (L.) Willd. endemic
 Bulbine alveolata S.A.Hammer, endemic
 Bulbine angustifolia Poelln. indigenous
 Bulbine annua (L.) Willd. endemic
 Bulbine asphodeloides (L.) Spreng. indigenous
 Bulbine asphodeloides (L.) Spreng. var. monticola Poelln. accepted as Bulbine abyssinica A.Rich.
 Bulbine asphodeloides (L.) Spreng. var. otaviensis Poelln. accepted as Bulbine capitata Poelln.	
 Bulbine bachmanniana Schinz, accepted as Bulbine nutans (Jacq.) Spreng.
 Bulbine bruynsii S.A.Hammer, endemic
 Bulbine canaliculata G.Will. accepted as Bulbine erectipilosa G.Will.
 Bulbine capensis Baijnath ex G.Will. indigenous
 Bulbine capitata Poelln. indigenous
 Bulbine cataphyllata Poelln. accepted as Bulbine cepacea (Burm.f.) Wijnands
 Bulbine cepacea (Burm.f.) Wijnands, endemic
 Bulbine coetzeei Oberm. indigenous
 Bulbine cremnophila Van Jaarsv. endemic
 Bulbine crocea L.Guthrie, accepted as Bulbine asphodeloides (L.) Spreng.
 Bulbine dactylopsoides G.Will. endemic
 Bulbine densiflora Baker, accepted as Bulbine narcissifolia Salm-Dyck
 Bulbine dewetii Van Jaarsv. endemic
 Bulbine diphylla Schltr. ex Poelln. endemic
 Bulbine disimilis G.Will. endemic
 Bulbine dubia Schult. & J.H.Schult. accepted as Bulbine favosa (Thunb.) Schult. & Schult.f. indigenous
 Bulbine ensifolia Baker, accepted as Bulbine latifolia (L.f.) Schult. & J.H.Schult. var. latifolia
 Bulbine erectipilosa G.Will. endemic
 Bulbine esterhuyseniae Baijnath, endemic
 Bulbine fallax Poelln. endemic
 Bulbine favosa (Thunb.) Schult. & Schult.f. indigenous
 Bulbine filifolia Baker, accepted as Bulbine favosa (Thunb.) Schult. & Schult.f.
 Bulbine flexicaulis Baker, endemic
 Bulbine flexuosa Schltr. endemic
 Bulbine foleyi E.Phillips, endemic
 Bulbine fragilis G.Will. endemic
 Bulbine frutescens (L.) Willd. indigenous
 Bulbine hallii G.Will. endemic
 Bulbine haworthioides B.Nord. endemic
 Bulbine inamarxiae G.Will. & A.P.Dold, endemic
 Bulbine inflata Oberm. indigenous
 Bulbine lagopus (Thunb.) N.E.Br. indigenous
 Bulbine lamprophylla G.Will. endemic
 Bulbine latifolia (L.f.) Schult. & J.H.Schult. indigenous
 Bulbine latifolia (L.f.) Schult. & J.H.Schult. var. curvata Van Jaarsv. endemic
 Bulbine latifolia (L.f.) Schult. & J.H.Schult. var. latifolia, endemic
 Bulbine lavrani G.Will. & Baijnath, endemic
 Bulbine lolita S.A.Hammer, indigenous
 Bulbine longifolia Schinz, indigenous
 Bulbine louwii L.I.Hall, endemic
 Bulbine margarethae L.I.Hall, endemic
 Bulbine meiringii Van Jaarsv. endemic
 Bulbine melanovaginata G.Will. endemic
 Bulbine mesembryanthoides Haw. indigenous
 Bulbine mesembryanthoides Haw. subsp. mesembryanthoides, endemic
 Bulbine mesembryanthoides Haw. subsp. namaquensis G.Will. endemic
 Bulbine minima Baker, endemic
 Bulbine monophylla Poelln. endemic
 Bulbine muscicola G.Will. endemic
 Bulbine namaensis Schinz, indigenous
 Bulbine narcissifolia Salm-Dyck, indigenous
 Bulbine navicularifolia G.Will. endemic
 Bulbine nutans (Jacq.) Spreng. endemic
 Bulbine ophiophylla G.Will. indigenous
 Bulbine pendens G.Will. & Baijnath, endemic
 Bulbine praemorsa (Jacq.) Spreng. indigenous
 Bulbine quartzicola G.Will. endemic
 Bulbine ramosa Van Jaarsv. endemic
 Bulbine retinens Van Jaarsv. & S.A.Hammer, endemic
 Bulbine rhopalophylla Dinter, indigenous
 Bulbine rupicola G.Will. endemic
 Bulbine sedifolia Schltr. ex Poelln. endemic
 Bulbine semenaliundata G.Will. endemic
 Bulbine spongiosa Van Jaarsv. endemic
 Bulbine stolonifera Baijnath ex G.Will. indigenous
 Bulbine striata Baijnath & Van Jaarsv. endemic
 Bulbine succulenta Compton, endemic
 Bulbine suurbergensis Van Jaarsv. & A.E.van Wyk, endemic
 Bulbine tetraphylla Dinter accepted as Bulbine praemorsa (Jacq.) Spreng.	
 Bulbine thomasiae Van Jaarsv. endemic
 Bulbine torsiva G.Will. endemic
 Bulbine torta N.E.Br. endemic
 Bulbine triebneri Dinter, indigenous
 Bulbine truncata G.Will. endemic
 Bulbine tuberosa (Mill.) Oberm. accepted as Bulbine cepacea (Burm.f.) Wijnands
 Bulbine undulata G.Will. accepted as Bulbine semenaliundata G.Will.
 Bulbine vitrea G.Will. & Baijnath endemic
 Bulbine vittatifolia G.Will. endemic
 Bulbine wiesei L.I.Hall, endemic
 Bulbine zeyheri Baker, accepted as Bulbine praemorsa (Jacq.) Spreng.

Bulbinella 
Genus Bulbinella:
 Bulbinella barkeriae P.L.Perry, endemic
 Bulbinella calcicola J.C.Manning & Goldblatt, indigenous
 Bulbinella cauda-felis (L.f.) T.Durand & Schinz, endemic
 Bulbinella chartacea P.L.Perry, endemic
 Bulbinella ciliolata Kunth, endemic
 Bulbinella divaginata P.L.Perry, endemic
 Bulbinella eburniflora P.L.Perry, endemic
 Bulbinella elata P.L.Perry, endemic
 Bulbinella elegans Schltr. ex P.L.Perry, endemic
 Bulbinella gracilis Kunth, endemic
 Bulbinella graminifolia P.L.Perry, endemic
 Bulbinella latifolia Kunth, indigenous
 Bulbinella latifolia Kunth subsp. denticulata P.L.Perry, endemic
 Bulbinella latifolia Kunth subsp. doleritica (P.L.Perry) P.L.Perry, endemic
 Bulbinella latifolia Kunth subsp. latifolia, endemic
 Bulbinella latifolia Kunth subsp. toximontana P.L.Perry, endemic
 Bulbinella latifolia Kunth var. doleritica P.L.Perry, accepted as Bulbinella latifolia Kunth subsp. doleritica (P.L.Perry) P.L.Perry
 Bulbinella latifolia Kunth var. latifolia, accepted as Bulbinella latifolia Kunth subsp. latifolia
 Bulbinella nana P.L.Perry, endemic
 Bulbinella nutans (Thunb.) T.Durand & Schinz, indigenous
 Bulbinella nutans (Thunb.) T.Durand & Schinz subsp. nutans, endemic
 Bulbinella nutans (Thunb.) T.Durand & Schinz subsp. turfosicola (P.L.Perry) P.L.Perry, endemic
 Bulbinella nutans (Thunb.) T.Durand & Schinz var. nutans, accepted as Bulbinella nutans (Thunb.) T.Durand & Schinz subsp. nutans
 Bulbinella nutans (Thunb.) T.Durand & Schinz var. turfosicola P.L.Perry, accepted as Bulbinella nutans (Thunb.) T.Durand & Schinz subsp. turfosicola (P.L.Perry) P.L.Perry
 Bulbinella potbergensis P.L.Perry, endemic
 Bulbinella punctulata Zahlbr. endemic
 Bulbinella trinervis (Baker) P.L.Perry, endemic
 Bulbinella triquetra (L.f.) Kunth, endemic

Catavala 
Genus Catevala:
 Catevala arachnoidea (L.) Medik. accepted as Haworthia arachnoidea (L.) Duval var. arachnoidea, indigenous
 Catevala atroviridis Medik. accepted as Haworthia herbacea (Mill.) Stearn var. herbacea, indigenous

Chortolirion 
Genus Chortolirion:
 Chortolirion angolense (Baker) A.Berger, accepted as Aloe welwitschii Klopper & Gideon F.Sm. indigenous
 Chortolirion latifolium Zonn. & G.P.J.Fritz, accepted as Aloe jeppeae Klopper & Gideon F.Sm. indigenous
 Chortolirion tenuifolium (Engl.) A.Berger, accepted as Aloe bergeriana (Dinter) Boatwr. & J.C.Manning, indigenous

Gasteria 
Genus Gasteria:
 Gasteria acinacifolia (J.Jacq.) Haw.	endemic
 Gasteria angulata (Willd.) Haw. accepted as Gasteria carinata (Mill.) Duval var. carinata
 Gasteria angustianum Poelln. accepted as Gasteria brachyphylla (Salm-Dyck) Van Jaarsv. var. brachyphylla
 Gasteria batesiana G.D.Rowley, indigenous
 Gasteria batesiana G.D.Rowley var. batesiana, endemic
 Gasteria batesiana G.D.Rowley var. dolomitica Van Jaarsv. & A.E.van Wyk, endemic
 Gasteria baylissiana Rauh, endemic
 Gasteria bicolor Haw., indigenous
 Gasteria bicolor Haw. var. bicolor, endemic
 Gasteria bicolor Haw. var. fallax (Haw.) Van Jaarsv., indigenous
 Gasteria bicolor Haw. var. liliputana (Poelln.) Van Jaarsv. endemic
 Gasteria biformis Poelln. accepted as Gasteria bicolor Haw. var. bicolor
 Gasteria brachyphylla (Salm-Dyck) Van Jaarsv. indigenous
 Gasteria brachyphylla (Salm-Dyck) Van Jaarsv. var. bayeri Van Jaarsv. endemic
 Gasteria brachyphylla (Salm-Dyck) Van Jaarsv. var. brachyphylla, endemic
 Gasteria brevifolia Haw. endemic
 Gasteria caespitosa Poelln. accepted as Gasteria bicolor Haw. var. bicolor
 Gasteria carinata (Mill.) Duval, indigenous
 Gasteria carinata (Mill.) Duval var. carinata, endemic
 Gasteria carinata (Mill.) Duval var. glabra (Salm-Dyck) Van Jaarsv. endemic
 Gasteria carinata (Mill.) Duval var. retusa Van Jaarsv. accepted as Gasteria retusa (Van Jaarsv.) Van Jaarsv. endemic
 Gasteria carinata (Mill.) Duval var. thunbergii (N.E.Br.) Van Jaarsv. accepted as Gasteria carinata (Mill.) Duval var. verrucosa (Mill.) Van Jaarsv. endemic
 Gasteria carinata (Mill.) Duval var. verrucosa (Mill.) Van Jaarsv. endemic
 Gasteria chamaegigas Poelln. accepted as Gasteria bicolor Haw. var. bicolor
 Gasteria conspurcata (Salm-Dyck) Haw. accepted as Gasteria disticha (L.) Haw. var. disticha
 Gasteria croucheri (Hook.f.) Baker, indigenous
 Gasteria croucheri (Hook.f.) Baker subsp. croucheri, indigenous
 Gasteria croucheri (Hook.f.) Baker subsp. pendulifolia (Van Jaarsv.) Zonn. indigenous
 Gasteria decipiens Haw. accepted as Gasteria nitida (Salm-Dyck) Haw.
 Gasteria dicta N.E.Br. indigenous
 Gasteria disticha (L.) Haw. indigenous
 Gasteria disticha (L.) Haw. var. disticha, indigenous
 Gasteria disticha (L.) Haw. var. langebergensis Van Jaarsv. indigenous
 Gasteria disticha (L.) Haw. var. robusta Van Jaarsv. indigenous
 Gasteria doreeniae Van Jaarsv. & A.E.van Wyk, endemic
 Gasteria ellaphieae Van Jaarsv. endemic
 Gasteria elongata Baker, endemic
 Gasteria excavata (Willd.) Haw. accepted as Gasteria carinata (Mill.) Duval var. carinata
 Gasteria excelsa Baker, endemic
 Gasteria fuscopunctata Baker, accepted as Gasteria excelsa Baker
 Gasteria glauca Van Jaarsv. endemic
 Gasteria glomerata Van Jaarsv. endemic
 Gasteria gracilis Baker, endemic
 Gasteria herreana Poelln. accepted as Gasteria bicolor Haw. var. bicolor
 Gasteria humilis Poelln. accepted as Gasteria carinata (Mill.) Duval var. carinata
 Gasteria inexpectata Poelln. accepted as Gasteria acinacifolia (J.Jacq.) Haw.
 Gasteria kirsteana Poelln. accepted as Gasteria bicolor Haw. var. bicolor
 Gasteria koenii Van Jaarsv. endemic
 Gasteria laetepuncta Haw. accepted as Gasteria carinata (Mill.) Duval var. carinata
 Gasteria liliputana Poelln. accepted as Gasteria bicolor Haw. var. liliputana (Poelln.) Van Jaarsv.
 Gasteria loeriensis Poelln. endemic
 Gasteria longiana Poelln. accepted as Gasteria bicolor Haw. var. bicolor
 Gasteria lutzii Poelln. accepted as Gasteria excelsa Baker
 Gasteria maculata (Thunb.) Haw. accepted as Gasteria bicolor Haw. var. bicolor
 Gasteria mollis Haw. accepted as Gasteria disticha (L.) Haw. var. disticha
 Gasteria multiplex Poelln. accepted as Gasteria bicolor Haw. var. bicolor
 Gasteria nigricans (Haw.) Duval, accepted as Gasteria disticha (L.) Haw. var. disticha
 Gasteria nitida (Salm-Dyck) Haw. endemic
 Gasteria nitida (Salm-Dyck) Haw. var. armstrongii (Schonland) Van Jaarsv. accepted as Gasteria armstrongii Schonland, endemic
 Gasteria obliqua (Haw.) Duval, accepted as Gasteria bicolor Haw. var. bicolor
 Gasteria obtusa (Salm-Dyck) Haw. accepted as Gasteria nitida (Salm-Dyck) Haw.
 Gasteria obtusifolia (Salm-Dyck) Haw. accepted as Gasteria disticha (L.) Haw. var. disticha
 Gasteria pallescens Baker, accepted as Gasteria carinata (Mill.) Duval var. carinata
 Gasteria parvifolia Baker, accepted as Gasteria carinata (Mill.) Duval var. carinata
 Gasteria patentissima Poelln. accepted as Gasteria carinata (Mill.) Duval var. glabra (Salm-Dyck) Van Jaarsv.
 Gasteria pendulifolia Van Jaarsv. accepted as Gasteria croucheri (Hook.f.) Baker subsp. pendulifolia (Van Jaarsv.) Zonn. endemic
 Gasteria pillansii Kensit, indigenous
 Gasteria pillansii Kensit var. ernesti-ruschii (Dinter & Poelln.) Van Jaarsv. indigenous
 Gasteria pillansii Kensit var. hallii Van Jaarsv. indigenous
 Gasteria pillansii Kensit var. pillansii, endemic
 Gasteria poellnitziana H.Jacobsen, accepted as Gasteria pulchra (Aiton) Haw.
 Gasteria polita Van Jaarsv. endemic
 Gasteria porphyrophylla Baker, accepted as Gasteria carinata (Mill.) Duval var. carinata
 Gasteria prolifera Lem. endemic
 Gasteria pseudonigricans (Salm-Dyck) Haw. indigenous	
 Gasteria pulchra (Aiton) Haw. endemic	
 Gasteria radulosa Baker, accepted as Gasteria carinata (Mill.) Duval var. verrucosa (Mill.) Van Jaarsv.
 Gasteria rawlinsonii Oberm. endemic
 Gasteria repens Haw. accepted as Gasteria carinata (Mill.) Duval var. verrucosa (Mill.) Van Jaarsv.
 Gasteria retata Haw. accepted as Gasteria bicolor Haw. var. bicolor
 Gasteria retusa (Van Jaarsv.) Van Jaarsv.	
 Gasteria salmdyckiana Poelln. accepted as Gasteria bicolor Haw. var. bicolor
 Gasteria schweickerdtiana Poelln.	Gasteria carinata (Mill.) Duval var. glabra (Salm-Dyck) Van Jaarsv.
 Gasteria spiralis Baker	Gasteria bicolor Haw. var. bicolor
 Gasteria subcarinata (Salm-Dyck) Haw. accepted as Gasteria carinata (Mill.) Duval var. carinata
 Gasteria sulcata (Salm-Dyck) Haw. accepted as Gasteria carinata (Mill.) Duval var. carinata
 Gasteria thunbergii N.E.Br. accepted as Gasteria carinata (Mill.) Duval var. verrucosa (Mill.) Van Jaarsv.
 Gasteria transvaalensis De Smet, accepted as Gasteria batesiana G.D.Rowley var. batesiana
 Gasteria triebneriana Poelln. accepted as Gasteria brachyphylla (Salm-Dyck) Van Jaarsv. var. brachyphylla
 Gasteria trigona Haw. endemic
 Gasteria tukhelensis Van Jaarsv. indigenous
 Gasteria variolosa Baker, accepted as Gasteria bicolor Haw. var. bicolor
 Gasteria verrucosa (Mill.) Duval, accepted as Gasteria carinata (Mill.) Duval var. verrucosa (Mill.) Van Jaarsv.
 Gasteria vlaaktensis Poelln. accepted as Gasteria brachyphylla (Salm-Dyck) Van Jaarsv. var. brachyphylla
 Gasteria vlokii Van Jaarsv.endemic
 Gasteria zeyheri (Salm-Dyck) Baker, accepted as Gasteria bicolor Haw. var. bicolor

Gonialoe 
Genus Gonialoe:
 Gonialoe variegata (L.) Boatwr. & J.C.Manning, indigenous

Haworthia 
Genus Haworthia:
 Haworthia adelaidensis (Poelln.) Breuer, accepted as Haworthiopsis coarctata (Haw.) G.D.Rowley var. adelaidensis (Poelln.) G.D.Rowley, indigenous
 Haworthia aegrota Poelln. accepted as Haworthia herbacea (Mill.) Stearn var. herbacea, indigenous
 Haworthia agavoides Zantner & Poelln. accepted as Haworthiopsis sordida (Haw.) G.D.Rowley var. sordida, indigenous
 Haworthia agnis Battista, accepted as Haworthia nortieri G.G.Sm. var. nortieri, endemic
 Haworthia albanensis Schonland, accepted as Haworthia angustifolia Haw. var. angustifolia, indigenous
 Haworthia albicans (Haw.) Haw. accepted as Tulista marginata (Lam.) G.D.Rowley, indigenous
 Haworthia albicans (Haw.) Haw. var. virescens (Haw.) Baker, accepted as Tulista marginata (Lam.) G.D.Rowley, indigenous
 Haworthia albispina M.Hayashi, accepted as Haworthia nortieri G.G.Sm. var. albispina (M.Hayashi) M.B.Bayer, indigenous
 Haworthia altilinea Haw. accepted as Haworthia mucronata Haw. var. mucronata, indigenous
 Haworthia altilinea Haw. var. inermis (Poelln.) Poelln. accepted as Haworthia bolusii Baker var. blackbeardiana (Poelln.) M.B.Bayer, indigenous
 Haworthia altilinea Haw. var. limpida (Haw.) Poelln. accepted as Haworthia mucronata Haw. var. inconfluens (Poelln.) M.B.Bayer, indigenous
 Haworthia altilinea Haw. var. limpida (Haw.) Poelln. forma inconfluens, accepted as Haworthia mucronata Haw. var. inconfluens (Poelln.) M.B.Bayer, indigenous
 Haworthia altilinea Haw. var. limpida (Haw.) Poelln. forma inermis accepted as Haworthia bolusii Baker var. blackbeardiana (Poelln.) M.B.Bayer, indigenous
 Haworthia altilinea Haw. var. morrisiae Poelln. accepted as Haworthia mucronata Haw. var. morrisiae (Poelln.) Poelln. indigenous
 Haworthia altissima  (M.B.Bayer) M.Hayashi accepted as Haworthia angustifolia Haw. var. altissima M.B.Bayer, indigenous
 Haworthia amethysta M.Hayashi, accepted as Haworthia decipiens Poelln. var. cyanea M.B.Bayer, indigenous
 Haworthia angiras M.Hayashi, accepted as Haworthia arachnoidea (L.) Duval var. setata (Haw.) M.B.Bayer, indigenous
 Haworthia angolensis Baker, accepted as Aloe welwitschii Klopper & Gideon F.Sm.
 Haworthia angustata (Poelln.) Breuer, accepted as Haworthia cymbiformis (Haw.) Duval var. cymbiformis, indigenous
 Haworthia angustifolia Haw. endemic
 Haworthia angustifolia Haw. forma baylissii (C.L.Scott) M.B.Bayer, accepted as Haworthia angustifolia Haw. var. baylissii (C.L.Scott) M.B.Bayer, indigenous
 Haworthia angustifolia Haw. forma paucifolia (G.G.Sm.) Pilbeam, accepted as Haworthia angustifolia Haw. var. paucifolia G.G.Sm., indigenous
 Haworthia angustifolia Haw. var. altissima M.B.Bayer, endemic
 Haworthia angustifolia Haw. var. angustifolia, endemic
 Haworthia angustifolia Haw. var. baylissii (C.L.Scott) M.B.Bayer, endemic
 Haworthia angustifolia Haw. var. denticulifera Poelln. accepted as Haworthia chloracantha Haw. var. denticulifera (Poelln.) M.B.Bayer, indigenous
 Haworthia angustifolia Haw. var. grandis G.G.Sm. accepted as Haworthia angustifolia Haw. var. angustifolia, indigenous
 Haworthia angustifolia Haw. var. liliputana Uitewaal, accepted as Haworthia chloracantha Haw. var. denticulifera (Poelln.) M.B.Bayer, indigenous
 Haworthia angustifolia Haw. var. paucifolia G.G.Sm. endemic
 Haworthia angustifolia Haw. var. subfalcata Poelln. accepted as Haworthia mirabilis (Haw.) Haw. var. maraisii (Poelln.) M.B.Bayer, indigenous
 Haworthia aquamarina M.Hayashi, accepted as Haworthia bolusii Baker var. pringlei (C.L.Scott) M.B.Bayer, indigenous
 Haworthia arabesqua M.Hayashi, accepted as Haworthia cooperi Baker var. isabellae (Poelln.) M.B.Bayer, indigenous
 Haworthia arachnoidea (L.) Duval, endemic
 Haworthia arachnoidea (L.) Duval var. angiras (M.Hayashi) Breuer, accepted as Haworthia arachnoidea (L.) Duval var. setata (Haw.) M.B.Bayer, indigenous
 Haworthia arachnoidea (L.) Duval var. arachnoidea, endemic
 Haworthia arachnoidea (L.) Duval var. aranea (A.Berger) M.B.Bayer, endemic
 Haworthia arachnoidea (L.) Duval var. calitzdorpensis (Breuer) Breuer, endemic
 Haworthia arachnoidea (L.) Duval var. joubertii (M.Hayashi) Breuer, accepted as Haworthia arachnoidea (L.) Duval var. arachnoidea, indigenous
 Haworthia arachnoidea (L.) Duval var. laxa (M.Hayashi) Breuer, accepted as Haworthia arachnoidea (L.) Duval var. arachnoidea, indigenous
 Haworthia arachnoidea (L.) Duval var. limbata (M.Hayashi) Breuer, accepted as Haworthia arachnoidea (L.) Duval var. arachnoidea, indigenous
 Haworthia arachnoidea (L.) Duval var. minor Haw. accepted as Haworthia arachnoidea (L.) Duval var. arachnoidea, indigenous
 Haworthia arachnoidea (L.) Duval var. namaquensis M.B.Bayer, endemic
 Haworthia arachnoidea (L.) Duval var. nigricans (Haw.) M.B.Bayer, endemic
 Haworthia arachnoidea (L.) Duval var. scabrispina M.B.Bayer, endemic
 Haworthia arachnoidea (L.) Duval var. setata (Haw.) M.B.Bayer, endemic
 Haworthia arachnoidea (L.) Duval var. xiphiophylla (Baker) Halda, accepted as Haworthia decipiens Poelln. var. xiphiophylla (Baker) M.B.Bayer, indigenous
 Haworthia aranea (A.Berger) M.B.Bayer, accepted as Haworthia arachnoidea (L.) Duval var. aranea (A.Berger) M.B.Bayer, endemic
 Haworthia aranea (A.Berger) M.B.Bayer var. candida (M.Hayashi) Breuer, accepted as Haworthia arachnoidea (L.) Duval var. setata (Haw.) M.B.Bayer, endemic
 Haworthia arcana (Gideon F.Sm. & N.R.Crouch) Breuer, accepted as Haworthiopsis limifolia (Marloth) G.D.Rowley var. arcana (Gideon F.Sm. & N.R.Crouch) G.D.Rowley, indigenous
 Haworthia archeri W.F.Barker ex M.B.Bayer, accepted as Haworthia marumiana Uitewaal var. archeri (W.F.Barker ex M.B.Bayer) M.B.Bayer, endemic
 Haworthia archeri W.F.Barker ex M.B.Bayer var. dimorpha M.B.Bayer, accepted as Haworthia marumiana Uitewaal var. dimorpha (M.B.Bayer) M.B.Bayer, indigenous
 Haworthia aristata Haw. endemic
 Haworthia armstrongii Poelln. accepted as Haworthiopsis glauca (Baker) G.D.Rowley var. herrei (Poelln.) G.D.Rowley, indigenous
 Haworthia asema (M.B.Bayer) M.Hayashi, accepted as Haworthia monticola Fourc. var. asema M.B.Bayer, endemic
 Haworthia aspera Haw. var. major (Haw.) Parr, accepted as Astroloba corrugata N.L.Mey. & Gideon F.Sm.
 Haworthia asperiuscula Haw. accepted as Haworthiopsis viscosa (L.) Gildenh. & Klopper var. viscosa, indigenous
 Haworthia asperiuscula Haw. var. patagiata G.G.Sm. accepted as Haworthiopsis viscosa (L.) Gildenh. & Klopper var. viscosa, indigenous
 Haworthia asperiuscula Haw. var. subintegra G.G.Sm. accepted as Haworthiopsis viscosa (L.) Gildenh. & Klopper var. viscosa, indigenous
 Haworthia asperula Haw. accepted as Haworthia mirabilis (Haw.) Haw. var. maraisii (Poelln.) M.B.Bayer, indigenous
 Haworthia atrofusca G.G.Sm. accepted as Haworthia mirabilis (Haw.) Haw. var. atrofusca (G.G.Sm.) M.B.Bayer, endemic
 Haworthia atrofusca G.G.Sm. var. enigma (M.Hayashi) Breuer, accepted as Haworthia mirabilis (Haw.) Haw. var. atrofusca (G.G.Sm.) M.B.Bayer, endemic
 Haworthia atrovirens (DC.) Haw. accepted as Haworthia herbacea (Mill.) Stearn var. herbacea, indigenous
 Haworthia attenuata (Haw.) Haw. accepted as Haworthiopsis attenuata (Haw.) G.D.Rowley, endemic
 Haworthia attenuata (Haw.) Haw. forma britteniae (Poelln.) M.B.Bayer, accepted as Haworthiopsis attenuata (Haw.) G.D.Rowley var. attenuata, indigenous
 Haworthia attenuata (Haw.) Haw. forma clariperla (Haw.) M.B.Bayer, accepted as Haworthiopsis attenuata (Haw.) G.D.Rowley var. attenuata, indigenous
 Haworthia attenuata (Haw.) Haw. var. britteniae (Poelln.) Poelln. accepted as Haworthiopsis attenuata (Haw.) G.D.Rowley var. attenuata, indigenous
 Haworthia attenuata (Haw.) Haw. var. clariperla (Haw.) Baker, accepted as Haworthiopsis attenuata (Haw.) G.D.Rowley var. attenuata, indigenous
 Haworthia attenuata (Haw.) Haw. var. deltoidea R.S.Farden, accepted as Haworthiopsis attenuata (Haw.) G.D.Rowley var. attenuata, indigenous
 Haworthia attenuata (Haw.) Haw. var. glabrata (Salm-Dyck) M.B.Bayer, accepted as Haworthiopsis attenuata (Haw.) G.D.Rowley var. glabrata (Salm-Dyck) G.D.Rowley, indigenous
 Haworthia attenuata (Haw.) Haw. var. inusitata R.S.Farden, accepted as Haworthiopsis attenuata (Haw.) G.D.Rowley var. attenuata, indigenous
 Haworthia attenuata (Haw.) Haw. var. linearis R.S.Farden, accepted as Haworthiopsis attenuata (Haw.) G.D.Rowley var. attenuata, indigenous
 Haworthia attenuata (Haw.) Haw. var. minissima R.S.Farden, accepted as Haworthiopsis attenuata (Haw.) G.D.Rowley var. attenuata, indigenous
 Haworthia attenuata (Haw.) Haw. var. odonoghueana R.S.Farden, accepted as Haworthiopsis attenuata (Haw.) G.D.Rowley var. attenuata, indigenous
 Haworthia attenuata (Haw.) Haw. var. radula (Jacq.) M.B.Bayer, accepted as Haworthiopsis attenuata (Haw.) G.D.Rowley var. radula (Jacq.) G.D.Rowley, endemic
 Haworthia attenuata (Haw.) Haw. var. uitewaaliana R.S.Farden, accepted as Haworthiopsis attenuata (Haw.) G.D.Rowley var. attenuata, indigenous
 Haworthia azurea M.Hayashi. accepted as Haworthia cooperi Baker var. isabellae (Poelln.) M.B.Bayer, endemic
 Haworthia baccata G.G.Sm. accepted as Haworthiopsis coarctata (Haw.) G.D.Rowley var. coarctata, indigenous
 Haworthia badia Poelln. accepted as Haworthia mirabilis (Haw.) Haw. var. badia (Poelln.) M.B.Bayer, indigenous
 Haworthia badia Poelln. var. bobii (M.Hayashi) Breuer, accepted as Haworthia mirabilis (Haw.) Haw. var. badia (Poelln.) M.B.Bayer, indigenous
 Haworthia badia Poelln. var. joleneae (M.Hayashi) Breuer, accepted as Haworthia mirabilis (Haw.) Haw. var. badia (Poelln.) M.B.Bayer, indigenous
 Haworthia batesiana Uitewaal, accepted as Haworthia marumiana Uitewaal var. batesiana (Uitewaal) M.B.Bayer, indigenous
 Haworthia batesiana Uitewaal var. lepida (G.G.Sm.) Breuer, accepted as Haworthia cymbiformis (Haw.) Duval var. cymbiformis, indigenous
 Haworthia batesiana Uitewaal var. reddii (C.L.Scott) Breuer, accepted as Haworthia marumiana Uitewaal var. reddii (C.L.Scott) M.B.Bayer, indigenous
 Haworthia bathylis M.Hayashi, accepted as Haworthia cooperi Baker var. isabellae (Poelln.) M.B.Bayer, indigenous
 Haworthia batteniae C.L.Scott, accepted as Haworthia bolusii Baker var. blackbeardiana (Poelln.) M.B.Bayer, indigenous
 Haworthia bayeri J.D.Venter & S.A.Hammer, endemic
 Haworthia bayeri J.D.Venter & S.A.Hammer var. hayashii (M.Hayashi) Breuer, accepted as Haworthia bayeri J.D.Venter & S.A.Hammer, indigenous
 Haworthia bayeri J.D.Venter & S.A.Hammer var. jadea (M.Hayashi) Breuer, accepted as Haworthia bayeri J.D.Venter & S.A.Hammer, indigenous
 Haworthia baylissii C.L.Scott, accepted as Haworthia angustifolia Haw. var. baylissii (C.L.Scott) M.B.Bayer, indigenous
 Haworthia beanii G.G.Sm. accepted as Haworthiopsis viscosa (L.) Gildenh. & Klopper var. viscosa, indigenous
 Haworthia beanii G.G.Sm. var. minor G.G.Sm. accepted as Haworthiopsis viscosa (L.) Gildenh. & Klopper var. viscosa, indigenous
 Haworthia bella M.Hayashi, accepted as Haworthia cooperi Baker var. isabellae (Poelln.) M.B.Bayer, indigenous
 Haworthia beukmannii (Poelln.) M.Hayashi, accepted as Haworthia mirabilis (Haw.) Haw. var. beukmannii (Poelln.) M.B.Bayer, indigenous
 Haworthia bicarinata (Haw.) Parr, accepted as × Astrolista bicarinata(Haw.) Molteno & Figueiredo, indigenous
 Haworthia bijliana Poelln. var. joubertii Poelln. accepted as Haworthia mucronata Haw. var. inconfluens (Poelln.) M.B.Bayer, indigenous
 Haworthia blackbeardiana Poelln. accepted as Haworthia bolusii Baker var. blackbeardiana (Poelln.) M.B.Bayer, indigenous
 Haworthia blackbeardiana Poelln. var. calaensis (Breuer) Breuer, accepted as Haworthia bolusii Baker var. blackbeardiana (Poelln.) M.B.Bayer, indigenous
 Haworthia blackbeardiana Poelln. var. major Poelln. accepted as Haworthia bolusii Baker var. blackbeardiana (Poelln.) M.B.Bayer, indigenous
 Haworthia blackbeardiana Poelln. var. specksii (Breuer) Breuer accepted as Haworthia bolusii Baker var. blackbeardiana (Poelln.) M.B.Bayer, indigenous
 Haworthia blackburniae Poelln. accepted as Haworthia emelyae Poelln. var. emelyae, indigenous
 Haworthia blackburniae W.F.Barker, endemic
 Haworthia blackburniae W.F.Barker var. blackburniae, endemic
 Haworthia blackburniae W.F.Barker var. derustensis M.B.Bayer, endemic
 Haworthia blackburniae W.F.Barker var. graminifolia (G.G.Sm.) M.B.Bayer, endemic
 Haworthia bobii M.Hayashi, accepted as Haworthia mirabilis (Haw.) Haw. var. badia (Poelln.) M.B.Bayer, indigenous
 Haworthia bolusii Baker, endemic
 Haworthia bolusii Baker var. aranea A.Berger, accepted as Haworthia arachnoidea (L.) Duval var. aranea (A.Berger) M.B.Bayer, indigenous
 Haworthia bolusii Baker var. blackbeardiana (Poelln.) M.B.Bayer, endemic
 Haworthia bolusii Baker var. bolusii, endemic
 Haworthia bolusii Baker var. floccosa (M.Hayashi) Breuer, accepted as Haworthia decipiens Poelln. var. virella M.B.Bayer, indigenous
 Haworthia bolusii Baker var. pringlei (C.L.Scott) M.B.Bayer, endemic
 Haworthia bolusii Baker var. semiviva Poelln. accepted as Haworthia semiviva (Poelln.) M.B.Bayer, indigenous
 Haworthia borealis M.Hayashi, accepted as Haworthia marumiana Uitewaal var. marumiana, indigenous
 Haworthia breueri M.Hayashi, accepted as Haworthia emelyae Poelln. var. emelyae, endemic
 Haworthia brevicula (G.G.Sm.) Breuer, accepted as Haworthiopsis reinwardtii (Salm-Dyck) G.D.Rowley var. brevicula (G.G.Sm.) G.D.Rowley, indigenous
 Haworthia brevis Haw. accepted as Tulista minor (Aiton) Gideon F.Sm. & Molteno, indigenous
 Haworthia britteniae Poelln. accepted as Haworthiopsis attenuata (Haw.) G.D.Rowley var. attenuata, indigenous
 Haworthia bronkhorstii M.Hayashi, accepted as Haworthia monticola Fourc. var. monticola, endemic
 Haworthia browniana Poelln. accepted as Haworthiopsis fasciata (Willd.) G.D.Rowley var. browniana (Poelln.) Gildenh. & Klopper, indigenous
 Haworthia bruynsii M.B.Bayer, accepted as Haworthiopsis bruynsii (M.B.Bayer) G.D.Rowley, endemic
 Haworthia bullulata (Jacq.) Parr, accepted as Astroloba bullulata (Jacq.) Uitewaal
 Haworthia caerula M.Hayashi & Breuer var. pallens (Breuer & M.Hayashi) Breuer, accepted as Haworthia cooperi Baker var. cooperi, indigenous
 Haworthia caerulea M.Hayashi & Breuer, accepted as Haworthia cooperi Baker var. gracilis (Poelln.) M.B.Bayer, indigenous
 Haworthia caespitosa Poelln. accepted as Haworthia retusa (L.) Duval var. turgida (Haw.) M.B.Bayer, indigenous
 Haworthia caespitosa Poelln. forma subplana Poelln. accepted as Haworthia retusa (L.) Duval var. turgida (Haw.) M.B.Bayer, indigenous
 Haworthia caespitosa Poelln. forma subproliferans Poelln. accepted as Haworthia retusa (L.) Duval var. turgida (Haw.) M.B.Bayer, indigenous
 Haworthia caespitosa Poelln. var. consanguinea (M.B.Bayer) Breuer, accepted as Haworthia mirabilis (Haw.) Haw. var. consanguinea M.B.Bayer, indigenous
 Haworthia calaensis Breuer, accepted as Haworthia bolusii Baker var. blackbeardiana (Poelln.) M.B.Bayer, indigenous
 Haworthia calcarea (M.B.Bayer) M.Hayashi, accepted as Haworthia rossouwii Poelln. var. calcarea (M.B.Bayer) M.B.Bayer, indigenous
 Haworthia calva M.Hayashi, accepted as Haworthia cooperi Baker,  indigenous
 Haworthia candida M.Hayashi, accepted as Haworthia arachnoidea (L.) Duval var. setata (Haw.) M.B.Bayer, indigenous
 Haworthia cangoensis M.Hayashi, accepted as Haworthia arachnoidea (L.) Duval var. setata (Haw.) M.B.Bayer, indigenous
 Haworthia cangoensis M.Hayashi var. kogmanensis (M.Hayashi) Breuer, accepted as Haworthia arachnoidea (L.) Duval var. setata (Haw.) M.B.Bayer, indigenous
 Haworthia cangoensis M.Hayashi var. royalis (M.Hayashi) Breuer, accepted as Haworthia arachnoidea (L.) Duval var. setata (Haw.) M.B.Bayer, indigenous
 Haworthia cangoensis M.Hayashi var. tradouwensis (Breuer) Breuer, accepted as Haworthia mucronata Haw. var. mucronata, indigenous
 Haworthia capillaris M.Hayashi, accepted as Haworthia bolusii Baker var. bolusii, indigenous
 Haworthia carrissoi Resende, accepted as Haworthiopsis glauca (Baker) G.D.Rowley var. glauca, indigenous
 Haworthia chalwinii Marloth & A.Berger, accepted as Haworthiopsis coarctata (Haw.) G.D.Rowley var. coarctata, indigenous
 Haworthia chloracantha Haw. endemic
 Haworthia chloracantha Haw. var. chloracantha, endemic
 Haworthia chloracantha Haw. var. denticulifera (Poelln.) M.B.Bayer, endemic
 Haworthia chloracantha Haw. var. subglauca Poelln. endemic
 Haworthia ciliata M.Hayashi, accepted as Haworthia cooperi Baker var. isabellae (Poelln.) M.B.Bayer, indigenous
 Haworthia clariperla Haw. accepted as Haworthiopsis attenuata (Haw.) G.D.Rowley var. attenuata, indigenous
 Haworthia coarctata Haw. accepted as Haworthiopsis coarctata (Haw.) G.D.Rowley, indigenous
 Haworthia coarctata Haw. forma chalwinii (Marloth & A.Berger) Pilbeam, accepted as Haworthiopsis coarctata  (Haw.) G.D.Rowley var. coarctata, indigenous
 Haworthia coarctata Haw. forma conspicua (Poelln.) Pilbeam, accepted as Haworthiopsis coarctata (Haw.) G.D.Rowley var. coarctata, indigenous
 Haworthia coarctata Haw. forma pseudocoarctata (Poelln.) Resende, accepted as Haworthiopsis coarctata (Haw.) G.D.Rowley var. coarctata, indigenous
 Haworthia coarctata Haw. subsp. adelaidensis (Poelln.) M.B.Bayer, accepted as Haworthiopsis coarctata (Haw.) G.D.Rowley var. adelaidensis (Poelln.) G.D.Rowley, indigenous
 Haworthia coarctata Haw. subsp. coarctata var. greenii, accepted as Haworthiopsis coarctata (Haw.) G.D.Rowley var. coarctata, indigenous
 Haworthia coarctata Haw. subsp. coarctata var.tenuis, accepted as Haworthiopsis coarctata (Haw.) G.D.Rowley var. tenuis (G.G.Sm.) G.D.Rowley, indigenous
 Haworthia coarctata Haw. var. adelaidensis (Poelln.) M.B.Bayer, accepted as Haworthiopsis coarctata (Haw.) G.D.Rowley var. adelaidensis (Poelln.) G.D.Rowley, endemic
 Haworthia coarctata Haw. var. coarctata forma greenii, accepted as Haworthiopsis coarctata (Haw.) G.D.Rowley var. coarctata, endemic
 Haworthia coarctata Haw. var. haworthia Resende, accepted as Haworthiopsis coarctata (Haw.) G.D.Rowley var. coarctata, indigenous
 Haworthia coarctata Haw. var. krausii Resende, accepted as Haworthiopsis coarctata (Haw.) G.D.Rowley var. coarctata, indigenous
 Haworthia coarctata Haw. var. tenuis (G.G.Sm.) M.B.Bayer, accepted as Haworthiopsis coarctata (Haw.) G.D.Rowley var. tenuis (G.G.Sm.) G.D.Rowley, endemic
 Haworthia coarctatoidea Resende & Pinto-Lopes, accepted as Haworthiopsis coarctata (Haw.) G.D.Rowley var. coarctata, indigenous
 Haworthia compacta (Triebner) Breuer, accepted as Haworthia cymbiformis (Haw.) Duval var. cymbiformis, indigenous
 Haworthia comptoniana G.G.Sm.	accepted as Haworthia emelyae Poelln. var. comptoniana (G.G.Sm.) J.D.Venter & S.A.Hammer, indigenous
 Haworthia concava Haw. accepted as Haworthia cymbiformis (Haw.) Duval var. cymbiformis, indigenous
 Haworthia concinna Haw. accepted as Haworthiopsis viscosa (L.) Gildenh. & Klopper var. viscosa, indigenous
 Haworthia congesta (Salm-Dyck) Parr, accepted as Astroloba congesta (Salm-Dyck) Uitewaal
 Haworthia consanguinea (M.B.Bayer) M.Hayashi, accepted as Haworthia mirabilis (Haw.) Haw. var. consanguinea M.B.Bayer, indigenous
 Haworthia cooperi Baker, endemic
 Haworthia cooperi Baker var. cooperi, endemic
 Haworthia cooperi Baker var. dielsiana (Poelln.) M.B.Bayer, endemic
 Haworthia cooperi Baker var. doldii M.B.Bayer, endemic
 Haworthia cooperi Baker var. gordoniana (Poelln.) M.B.Bayer, endemic
 Haworthia cooperi Baker var. gracilis (Poelln.) M.B.Bayer, endemic
 Haworthia cooperi Baker var. hisui (M.Hayashi) Breuer, accepted as Haworthia bolusii Baker var. pringlei (C.L.Scott) M.B.Bayer, indigenous
 Haworthia cooperi Baker var. isabellae (Poelln.) M.B.Bayer, endemic
 Haworthia cooperi Baker var. leightonii (G.G.Sm.) M.B.Bayer, endemic
 Haworthia cooperi Baker var. minima (M.B.Bayer) M.B.Bayer, accepted as Haworthia cooperi Baker var. tenera (Poelln.) M.B.Bayer, endemic
 Haworthia cooperi Baker var. picturata (M.B.Bayer) M.B.Bayer, endemic
 Haworthia cooperi Baker var. pilifera (Baker) M.B.Bayer, endemic
 Haworthia cooperi Baker var. tenera (Poelln.) M.B.Bayer, endemic
 Haworthia cooperi Baker var. truncata (H.Jacobsen) M.B.Bayer, endemic
 Haworthia cooperi Baker var. venusta (C.L.Scott) M.B.Bayer, endemic
 Haworthia cooperi Baker var. viridis (M.B.Bayer) M.B.Bayer, endemic
 Haworthia cordifolia Haw. accepted as Haworthiopsis viscosa (L.) Gildenh. & Klopper var. viscosa, indigenous
 Haworthia coriacea (Resende & Poelln.) Breuer, accepted as Haworthiopsis tessellata (Haw.) G.D.Rowley var. tessellata, indigenous
 Haworthia correcta Poelln. accepted as Haworthia emelyae Poelln. var. emelyae . indigenous
 Haworthia crinita M.Hayashi, accepted as Haworthia decipiens Poelln. var. virella M.B.Bayer, indigenous
 Haworthia crousii M.Hayashi, accepted as Haworthiopsis tessellata (Haw.) G.D.Rowley var. crousii (M.Hayashi) Gildenh. & Klopper, endemic
 Haworthia crystallina M.Hayashi, accepted as Haworthia mucronata Haw. var. inconfluens (Poelln.) M.B.Bayer, indigenous
 Haworthia cummingii Breuer & M.Hayashi, accepted as Haworthia cooperi Baker var. tenera (Poelln.) M.B.Bayer, indigenous
 Haworthia cuspidata Haw. accepted as Haworthia cymbiformis (Haw.) Duval var. cymbiformis, indigenous
 Haworthia cyanea (Baker) M.Hayashi, accepted as Haworthia decipiens Poelln. var. cyanea M.B.Bayer, indigenous
 Haworthia cyanea (M.B.Bayer) M.Hayashi var. amethysta (M.Hayashi) Breuer, accepted as Haworthia decipiens Poelln. var. cyanea M.B.Bayer, indigenous
 Haworthia cyanea (M.B.Bayer) M.Hayashi var. ianthina (M.Hayashi) Breuer, accepted as Haworthia decipiens Poelln. var. cyanea M.B.Bayer, indigenous
 Haworthia cyanea (M.B.Bayer) M.Hayashi var. succinea (M.Hayashi) Breuer, accepted as Haworthia decipiens Poelln. var. cyanea M.B.Baye, indigenous
 Haworthia cymbiformis (Haw.) Duval, endemic
 Haworthia cymbiformis (Haw.) Duval forma planifolia (Haw.) Pilbeam, accepted as Haworthia cymbiformis (Haw.) Duval var. cymbiformis, indigenous
 Haworthia cymbiformis (Haw.) Duval var. angustata Poelln. accepted as Haworthia cymbiformis (Haw.) Duval var. cymbiformis, indigenous
 Haworthia cymbiformis (Haw.) Duval var. angustata Poelln. forma subarmata, accepted as Haworthia cymbiformis (Haw.) Duval var. cymbiformis, indigenous
 Haworthia cymbiformis (Haw.) Duval var. brevifolia Poelln. accepted as Haworthia transiens (Poelln.) M.Hayashi, indigenous
 Haworthia cymbiformis (Haw.) Duval var. compacta Triebner, accepted as Haworthia cymbiformis (Haw.) Duval var. cymbiformis, indigenous
 Haworthia cymbiformis (Haw.) Duval var. cymbiformis, endemic
 Haworthia cymbiformis (Haw.) Duval var. cymbiformis forma ramosa, accepted as Haworthia cymbiformis (Haw.) Duval var. ramosa (G.G.Sm.) M.B.Bayer, indigenous
 Haworthia cymbiformis (Haw.) Duval var. incurvula (Poelln.) M.B.Bayer, endemic
 Haworthia cymbiformis (Haw.) Duval var. multifolia Triebner, accepted as Haworthia transiens (Poelln.) M.Hayashi, indigenous
 Haworthia cymbiformis (Haw.) Duval var. obesa Poelln., accepted as Haworthia cymbiformis (Haw.) Duval var. setulifera (Poelln.) M.B.Bayer, indigenous
 Haworthia cymbiformis (Haw.) Duval var. obtusa (Haw.) Baker, endemic
 Haworthia cymbiformis (Haw.) Duval var. planifolia (Haw.) Baker, accepted as Haworthia cymbiformis (Haw.) Duval var. cymbiformis, indigenous
 Haworthia cymbiformis (Haw.) Duval var. ramosa (G.G.Sm.) M.B.Bayer, endemic
 Haworthia cymbiformis (Haw.) Duval var. reddii (C.L.Scott) M.B.Bayer, accepted as Haworthia marumiana Uitewaal var. reddii (C.L.Scott) M.B.Bayer, endemic
 Haworthia cymbiformis (Haw.) Duval var. setulifera (Poelln.) M.B.Bayer, endemic
 Haworthia cymbiformis (Haw.) Duval var. transiens (Poelln.) M.B.Bayer, accepted as Haworthia transiens (Poelln.) M.Hayashi, indigenous
 Haworthia cymbiformis (Haw.) Duval var. translucens Triebner & Poelln. accepted as Haworthia transiens (Poelln.) M.Hayashi, indigenous
 Haworthia cymbiformis (Haw.) Duval var. umbraticola (Poelln.) M.B.Bayer, accepted as Haworthia cymbiformis (Haw.) Duval var. obtusa (Haw.) Baker, indigenous
 Haworthia davidii (Breuer) M.Hayashi & Breuer, accepted as Haworthia cooperi Baker var. leightonii (G.G.Sm.) M.B.Bayer, indigenous
 Haworthia decipiens Poelln. endemic
 Haworthia decipiens Poelln. var. cyanea M.B.Bayer, endemic
 Haworthia decipiens Poelln. var. decipiens, endemic
 Haworthia decipiens Poelln. var. exilis (M.Hayashi) Breuer, accepted as Haworthia decipiens Poelln. var. decipiens, indigenous
 Haworthia decipiens Poelln. var. incrassa (M.Hayashi) Breuer, accepted as Haworthia decipiens Poelln. var. decipiens, indigenous
 Haworthia decipiens Poelln. var. minor M.B.Bayer, endemic
 Haworthia decipiens Poelln. var. pringlei (C.L.Scott) M.B.Bayer, accepted as Haworthia bolusii Baker var. pringlei (C.L.Scott) M.B.Bayer, indigenous
 Haworthia decipiens Poelln. var. virella M.B.Bayer
 Haworthia decipiens Poelln. var. xiphiophylla (Baker) M.B.Bayer, endemic
 Haworthia dekenahii G.G.Sm. accepted as Haworthia pygmaea Poelln. var. dekenahii (G.G.Sm.) M.B.Bayer, indigenous
 Haworthia dekenahii G.G.Sm. var. argenteomaculosa G.G.Sm. accepted as Haworthia pygmaea Poelln. var. argenteomaculosa (G.G.Sm.) M.B.Bayer, indigenous
 Haworthia deltoidea (Hook.f.) Parr accepted as Astroloba congesta (Salm-Dyck) Uitewaal
 Haworthia deltoidea (Hook.f.) Parr var. intermedia (A.Berger) Parr, accepted as Astroloba congesta (Salm-Dyck) Uitewaal
 Haworthia deltoidea (Hook.f.) Parr var. turgida (A.Berger) Parr, accepted as Astroloba congesta (Salm-Dyck) Uitewaal
 Haworthia dentata (M.B.Bayer) M.Hayashi, accepted as Haworthia floribunda Poelln. var. dentata M.B.Bayer, indigenous
 Haworthia denticulata Haw. accepted as Haworthia aristata Haw. indigenous
 Haworthia denticulifera (Poelln.) M.Hayashi, accepted as Haworthia chloracantha Haw. var. denticulifera (Poelln.) M.B.Bayer, indigenous
 Haworthia depauperata (Poelln.) Breuer, accepted as Haworthia mirabilis (Haw.) Haw. var. triebneriana (Poelln.) M.B.Bayer, indigenous
 Haworthia derustensis (M.B.Bayer) M.Hayashi, accepted as Haworthia blackburniae W.F.Barker var. derustensis M.B.Bayer, indigenous
 Haworthia devriesii Breuer, accepted as Haworthia nortieri G.G.Sm. var. devriesii (Breuer) M.B.Bayer, endemic
 Haworthia dielsiana Poelln. accepted as Haworthia cooperi Baker var. dielsiana (Poelln.) M.B.Bayer, indigenous
 Haworthia dimorpha (M.B.Bayer) M.Hayashi, accepted as Haworthia marumiana Uitewaal var. dimorpha (M.B.Bayer) M.B.Bayer, indigenous
 Haworthia distincta N.E.Br. accepted as Haworthiopsis venosa (Lam.) G.D.Rowley, indigenous
 Haworthia divergens M.B.Bayer, accepted as Haworthia monticola Fourc. var. monticola indigenous
 Haworthia diversicolor (Triebner & Poelln.) M.Hayashi, accepted as Haworthia mirabilis (Haw.) Haw. var. triebneriana (Poelln.) M.B.Bayer, indigenous
 Haworthia diversifolia Poelln. accepted as Haworthiopsis nigra (Haw.) G.D.Rowley var. diversifolia (Poelln.) G.D.Rowley, indigenous
 Haworthia dodsoniana (Uitewaal) Parr, accepted as Astroloba herrei Uitewaal
 Haworthia doldii (M.B.Bayer) M.Hayashi, accepted as Haworthia cooperi Baker var. doldii M.B.Bayer, indigenous
 Haworthia egregia (Poelln.) Parr var. fardeniana (Uitewaal) Parr, accepted as Astroloba bullulata (Jacq.) Uitewaal
 Haworthia eilyae Poelln. accepted as Haworthiopsis glauca (Baker) G.D.Rowley var. herrei (Poelln.) G.D.Rowley, indigenous
 Haworthia eilyae Poelln. var. poellnitziana Resende, accepted as Haworthiopsis glauca (Baker) G.D.Rowley var. herrei (Poelln.) G.D.Rowley, indigenous
 Haworthia eilyae Poelln. var. zantneriana Resende, accepted as Haworthiopsis glauca (Baker) G.D.Rowley var. herrei (Poelln.) G.D.Rowley, indigenous
 Haworthia elizeae Breuer, accepted as Haworthia rossouwii Poelln. var. elizeae (Breuer) M.B.Bayer, endemic
 Haworthia emelyae Poelln. endemic
 Haworthia emelyae Poelln. var. beukmannii Poelln. accepted as Haworthia mirabilis (Haw.) Haw. var. beukmannii (Poelln.) M.B.Bayer, indigenous
 Haworthia emelyae Poelln. var. comptoniana (G.G.Sm.) J.D.Venter & S.A.Hammer, endemic
 Haworthia emelyae Poelln. var. emelyae, endemic
 Haworthia emelyae Poelln. var. major (G.G.Sm.) M.B.Bayer, endemic
 Haworthia emelyae Poelln. var. multifolia M.B.Bayer, endemic
 Haworthia emeralda M.Hayashi, accepted as Haworthia cooperi Baker var. viridis (M.B.Bayer) M.B.Bayer, indigenous
 Haworthia eminens M.Hayashi, accepted as Haworthia decipiens Poelln. var. virella M.B.Bayer, indigenous
 Haworthia engleri Dinter, accepted as Haworthiopsis tessellata (Haw.) G.D.Rowley var. tessellata, indigenous
 Haworthia enigma M.Hayashi, accepted as Haworthia mirabilis (Haw.) Haw. var. atrofusca (G.G.Sm.) M.B.Bayer, endemic
 Haworthia erecta Haw. accepted as Tulista minor (Aiton) Gideon F.Sm. & Molteno, indigenous
 Haworthia erii M.Hayashi, accepted as Haworthia decipiens Poelln. var. cyanea M.B.Bayer, indigenous
 Haworthia esterhuizenii M.Hayashi, accepted as Haworthia pygmaea Poelln. var. dekenahii (G.G.Sm.) M.B.Bayer, endemic
 Haworthia exilis M.Hayashi, accepted as Haworthia decipiens Poelln. var. decipiens, indigenous
 Haworthia fallax Poelln. accepted as Haworthiopsis coarctata (Haw.) G.D.Rowley var. coarctata, indigenous
 Haworthia fasciata (Willd.) Haw. accepted as Haworthiopsis fasciata (Willd.) G.D.Rowley, endemic
 Haworthia fasciata (Willd.) Haw. forma browniana (Poelln.) M.B.Bayer accepted as Haworthiopsis fasciata (Willd.) G.D.Rowley var. browniana (Poelln.) Gildenh. & Klopper, indigenous
 Haworthia fasciata (Willd.) Haw. forma subconfluens (Poelln.) Poelln. accepted as Haworthiopsis fasciata (Willd.) G.D.Rowley var. fasciata, indigenous
 Haworthia fasciata (Willd.) Haw. var. browniana (Poelln.) C.L.Scott, accepted as Haworthiopsis fasciata (Willd.) G.D.Rowley var. browniana (Poelln.) Gildenh. & Klopper, indigenous
 Haworthia fasciata (Willd.) Haw. var. fasciata forma ovato-lanceolata, accepted as Haworthiopsis fasciata (Willd.) G.D.Rowley var. fasciata, indigenous
 Haworthia fasciata (Willd.) Haw. var. fasciata forma sparsa, accepted as Haworthiopsis fasciata (Willd.) G.D.Rowley var. fasciata, indigenous
 Haworthia fasciata (Willd.) Haw. var. fasciata forma vanstaadenensis, accepted as Haworthiopsis fasciata (Willd.) G.D.Rowley var. fasciata, indigenous
 Haworthia fasciata (Willd.) Haw. var. fasciata forma variabilis, accepted as Haworthiopsis fasciata (Willd.) G.D.Rowley var. fasciata, indigenous
 Haworthia fasciata (Willd.) Haw. var. major (Salm-Dyck) Haw. accepted as Haworthiopsis fasciata (Willd.) G.D.Rowley var. fasciata, indigenous
 Haworthia fasciata (Willd.) Haw. var. subconfluens Poelln. accepted as Haworthiopsis fasciata (Willd.) G.D.Rowley var. fasciata, indigenous
 Haworthia flaccida (M.B.Bayer) Breuer, accepted as Haworthia herbacea (Mill.) Stearn var. flaccida M.B.Bayer, indigenous
 Haworthia flavida M.Hayashi, accepted as Haworthia decipiens Poelln. var. xiphiophylla (Baker) M.B.Bayer, indigenous
 Haworthia floccosa M.Hayashi, accepted as Haworthia decipiens Poelln. var. virella M.B.Bayer, indigenous
 Haworthia florens M.Hayashi, accepted as Haworthia cooperi Baker var. isabellae (Poelln.) M.B.Bayer, indigenous
 Haworthia floribunda Poelln. endemic
 Haworthia floribunda Poelln. var. dentata M.B.Bayer, endemic
 Haworthia floribunda Poelln. var. floribunda, endemic
 Haworthia floribunda Poelln. var. major M.B.Bayer, endemic
 Haworthia fluffa M.Hayashi, accepted as Haworthia decipiens Poelln. var. virella M.B.Bayer, indigenous
 Haworthia foliolosa (Haw.) Haw. accepted as Astroloba foliolosa (Haw.) Uitewaal
 Haworthia fouchei Poelln. accepted as Haworthia retusa (L.) Duval var. retusa, indigenous
 Haworthia fulva G.G.Sm. accepted as Haworthiopsis coarctata (Haw.) G.D.Rowley var. coarctata, indigenous
 Haworthia fusca Breuer, accepted as Haworthia pygmaea Poelln. var. fusca (Breuer) M.B.Bayer, indigenous
 Haworthia geraldii C.L.Scott, accepted as Haworthia retusa (L.) Duval var. retusa, endemic
 Haworthia giftbergensis (G.G.Sm.) Breuer, accepted as Haworthia nortieri G.G.Sm. var. nortieri, indigenous
 Haworthia gigantea (M.B.Bayer) M.Hayashi, accepted as Haworthiopsis limifolia (Marloth) G.D.Rowley var. gigantea (M.B.Bayer) G.D.Rowley, indigenous
 Haworthia gigas Poelln. accepted as Haworthia arachnoidea (L.) Duval var. setata (Haw.) M.B.Bayer, indigenous
 Haworthia glabrata (Salm-Dyck) Baker, accepted as Haworthiopsis attenuata (Haw.) G.D.Rowley var. glabrata (Salm-Dyck) G.D.Rowley, endemic
 Haworthia glabrata Baker var. concolor (Salm-Dyck) Baker, accepted as Haworthiopsis attenuata (Haw.) G.D.Rowley var. glabrata (Salm-Dyck) G.D.Rowley, indigenous
 Haworthia glabrata Baker var. perviridis (Salm-Dyck) Baker, accepted as Haworthiopsis attenuata (Haw.) G.D.Rowley var. glabrata (Salm-Dyck) G.D.Rowley, indigenous
 Haworthia glauca Baker, accepted as Haworthiopsis glauca (Baker) G.D.Rowley, endemic
 Haworthia glauca Baker forma jacobseniana (Poelln.) Pilbeam, accepted as Haworthiopsis glauca (Baker) G.D.Rowley var. herrei (Poelln.) G.D.Rowley, indigenous
 Haworthia glauca Baker forma jonesiae (Poelln.) Pilbeam, accepted as Haworthiopsis glauca (Baker) G.D.Rowley var. herrei (Poelln.) G.D.Rowley, indigenous
 Haworthia glauca Baker var. herrei (Poelln.) M.B.Bayer, accepted as Haworthiopsis glauca (Baker) G.D.Rowley var. herrei (Poelln.) G.D.Rowley, endemic
 Haworthia glauca Baker var. herrei (Poelln.) M.B.Bayer forma armstrongii, accepted as Haworthiopsis glauca (Baker) G.D.Rowley var. herrei (Poelln.) G.D.Rowley, indigenous
 Haworthia glaucophylla (M.B.Bayer) Breuer, accepted as Haworthiopsis limifolia (Marloth) G.D.Rowley var. glaucophylla (M.B.Bayer) Breuer, indigenous
 Haworthia globifera (M.B.Bayer) M.Hayashi, accepted as Haworthia pulchella M.B.Bayer var. globifera M.B.Bayer, indigenous
 Haworthia globosiflora G.G.Sm. accepted as Haworthia nortieri G.G.Sm. var. globosiflora (G.G.Sm.) M.B.Bayer, indigenous
 Haworthia gordoniana Poelln. accepted as Haworthia cooperi Baker var. gordoniana (Poelln.) M.B.Bayer, indigenous
 Haworthia gracilis Poelln. accepted as Haworthia cooperi Baker var. gracilis (Poelln.) M.B.Bayer, indigenous
 Haworthia gracilis Poelln. var. isabellae (Poelln.) M.B.Bayer, accepted as Haworthia cooperi Baker var. isabellae (Poelln.) M.B.Bayer, indigenous
 Haworthia gracilis Poelln. var. minima M.B.Bayer, accepted as Haworthia cooperi Baker var. tenera (Poelln.) M.B.Bayer, indigenous
 Haworthia gracilis Poelln. var. picturata M.B.Bayer, accepted as Haworthia cooperi Baker var. picturata (M.B.Bayer) M.B.Bayer, indigenous
 Haworthia gracilis Poelln. var. tenera (Poelln.) M.B.Bayer, accepted as Haworthia cooperi Baker var. tenera (Poelln.) M.B.Bayer, indigenous
 Haworthia gracilis Poelln. var. viridis M.B.Bayer accepted as Haworthia cooperi Baker var. viridis (M.B.Bayer) M.B.Bayer, indigenous
 Haworthia graminifolia G.G.Sm. accepted as Haworthia blackburniae W.F.Barker var. graminifolia (G.G.Sm.) M.B.Bayer, indigenous
 Haworthia graminifolia G.G.Sm. var. derustensis (M.B.Bayer) Breuer, accepted as Haworthia blackburniae W.F.Barker var. derustensis M.B.Bayer, indigenous
 Haworthia granata (Willd.) Haw. accepted as Tulista minor (Aiton) Gideon F.Sm. & Molteno, indigenous
 Haworthia granulata Marloth, accepted as Haworthiopsis granulata (Marloth) G.D.Rowley, indigenous
 Haworthia greenii Baker, accepted as Haworthiopsis coarctata (Haw.) G.D.Rowley var. coarctata, indigenous
 Haworthia greenii Baker forma minor Resende, accepted as Haworthiopsis coarctata (Haw.) G.D.Rowley var. coarctata, indigenous
 Haworthia greenii Baker var. silvicola G.G.Sm. accepted as Haworthiopsis coarctata (Haw.) G.D.Rowley var. coarctata, indigenous
 Haworthia greenii Haw. forma bakeri Resende, accepted as Haworthiopsis coarctata (Haw.) G.D.Rowley var. coarctata, indigenous
 Haworthia groenewaldii Breuer, accepted as Haworthia mutica Haw. indigenous
 Haworthia guttata Uitewaal, accepted as Haworthia reticulata (Haw.) Haw. var. reticulata, indigenous
 Haworthia haageana Poelln. accepted as Haworthia reticulata (Haw.) Haw. var. subregularis (Baker) Pilbeam, indigenous
 Haworthia haageana Poelln. var. subreticulata Poelln. accepted as Haworthia reticulata (Haw.) Haw. var. subregularis (Baker) Pilbeam, indigenous
 Haworthia habdomadis Poelln. accepted as Haworthia mucronata Haw. var. habdomadis (Poelln.) M.B.Bayer, indigenous
 Haworthia habdomadis Poelln. var. inconfluens (Poelln.) M.B.Bayer accepted as Haworthia mucronata Haw. var. inconfluens (Poelln.) M.B.Bayer, indigenous
 Haworthia habdomadis Poelln. var. morrisiae (Poelln.) M.B.Bayer accepted as Haworthia mucronata Haw. var. morrisiae (Poelln.) Poelln. indigenous
 Haworthia hamata M.Hayashi accepted as Haworthia cooperi Baker var. viridis (M.B.Bayer) M.B.Bayer, indigenous
 Haworthia hamata M.Hayashi var. subhamata (M.Hayashi) Breuer accepted as Haworthia cooperi Baker var. viridis (M.B.Bayer) M.B.Bayer, indigenous
 Haworthia harlandiana Parr, accepted as Astroloba herrei Uitewaal
 Haworthia harryi M.Hayashi, accepted as Haworthia cooperi Baker var. gordoniana (Poelln.) M.B.Bayer, indigenous
 Haworthia hastata M.Hayashi, accepted as Haworthia bolusii Baker var. pringlei (C.L.Scott) M.B.Bayer, indigenous
 Haworthia hayashi M.Hayashi, accepted as Haworthia bayeri J.D.Venter & S.A.Hammer, endemic
 Haworthia heidelbergensis G.G.Sm. accepted as Haworthia mirabilis (Haw.) Haw. var. heidelbergensis (G.G.Sm.) M.B.Bayer, indigenous
 Haworthia heidelbergensis G.G.Sm. var. minor M.B.Bayer accepted as Haworthia rossouwii Poelln. var. minor (M.B.Bayer) M.B.Bayer, endemic
 Haworthia heidelbergensis G.G.Sm. var. scabra M.B.Bayer, accepted as Haworthia mirabilis (Haw.) Haw. var. scabra (M.B.Bayer) M.B.Bayer, endemic
 Haworthia heidelbergensis G.G.Sm. var. toonensis M.B.Bayer, accepted as Haworthia mirabilis (Haw.) Haw. var. toonensis (M.B.Bayer) M.B.Bayer, endemic
 Haworthia helmiae Poelln. accepted as Haworthia arachnoidea (L.) Duval var. nigricans (Haw.) M.B.Bayer, indigenous
 Haworthia hemicrypta (M.B.Bayer) M.Hayashi accepted as Haworthia variegata L.Bolus var. hemicrypta M.B.Bayer, indigenous
 Haworthia herbacea (Mill.) Stearn, endemic
 Haworthia herbacea (Mill.) Stearn var. flaccida M.B.Bayer, endemic
 Haworthia herbacea (Mill.) Stearn var. herbacea, endemic
 Haworthia herbacea (Mill.) Stearn var. lupula M.B.Bayer, endemic
 Haworthia herbacea (Mill.) Stearn var. paynei (Poelln.) M.B.Bayer, accepted as Haworthia herbacea (Mill.) Stearn var. herbacea, endemic
 Haworthia herrei Poelln. accepted as Haworthiopsis glauca (Baker) G.D.Rowley var. herrei (Poelln.) G.D.Rowley, indigenous
 Haworthia herrei Poelln. var. depauperata Poelln. accepted as Haworthiopsis glauca (Baker) G.D.Rowley var. herrei (Poelln.) G.D.Rowley, indigenous
 Haworthia herrei Poelln. var. poellnitzii Resende, accepted as Haworthiopsis glauca (Baker) G.D.Rowley var. herrei (Poelln.) G.D.Rowley, indigenous
 Haworthia hilliana Poelln. accepted as Haworthia cymbiformis (Haw.) Duval var. obtusa (Haw.) Baker, indigenous
 Haworthia hisui M.Hayashi, accepted as Haworthia bolusii Baker var. pringlei (C.L.Scott) M.B.Bayer, indigenous
 Haworthia hurlingii Poelln. accepted as Haworthia reticulata (Haw.) Haw. var. hurlingii (Poelln.) M.B.Bayer, indigenous
 Haworthia hurlingii Poelln. var. ambigua Triebner & Poelln. accepted as Haworthia reticulata (Haw.) Haw. var. reticulata, indigenous
 Haworthia ianthina M.Hayashi, accepted as Haworthia decipiens Poelln. var. cyanea M.B.Bayer, indigenous
 Haworthia ikra Breuer, accepted as Haworthia cooperi Baker var. truncata (H.Jacobsen) M.B.Bayer, indigenous
 Haworthia inconfluens (Poelln.) M.B.Bayer, accepted as Haworthia mucronata Haw. var. inconfluens (Poelln.) M.B.Bayer, indigenous
 Haworthia inconfluens (Poelln.) M.B.Bayer var. crystallina (M.Hayashi) Breuer, accepted as Haworthia mucronata Haw. var. inconfluens (Poelln.) M.B.Bayer, indigenous
 Haworthia inconfluens (Poelln.) M.B.Bayer var. habdomadis (Poelln.) M.B.Bayer, accepted as Haworthia mucronata Haw. var. habdomadis (Poelln.) M.B.Bayer, indigenous
 Haworthia inconfluens (Poelln.) M.B.Bayer var. lockwoodii (Archibald) Breuer, accepted as Haworthia lockwoodii Archibald, indigenous
 Haworthia inconfluens (Poelln.) M.B.Bayer var. morrisiae (Poelln.) M.B.Bayer, accepted as Haworthia mucronata Haw. var. morrisiae (Poelln.) Poelln., indigenous
 Haworthia incrassa M.Hayashi, accepted as Haworthia decipiens Poelln. var. decipiens, indigenous
 Haworthia incurvula Poelln. accepted as Haworthia cymbiformis (Haw.) Duval var. incurvula (Poelln.) M.B.Bayer, indigenous
 Haworthia indigoa M.Hayashi, accepted as Haworthia bayeri J.D.Venter & S.A.Hammer, indigenous
 Haworthia indigoa M.Hayashi var. truterorum (Breuer & Marx) Breuer, accepted as Haworthia bayeri J.D.Venter & S.A.Hammer, indigenous
 Haworthia indurata Haw., accepted as Haworthiopsis viscosa (L.) Gildenh. & Klopper var. viscosa, indigenous
 Haworthia inermis Poelln., accepted as Haworthia bolusii Baker var. blackbeardiana (Poelln.) M.B.Bayer, indigenous
 Haworthia insipida Breuer, accepted as Haworthia zantneriana Poelln. var. minor M.B.Bayer, indigenous
 Haworthia integra Poelln. accepted as Haworthia mucronata Haw. var. rycroftiana (M.B.Bayer) M.B.Bayer, indigenous
 Haworthia integra Poelln. var. standeri Esterhuizen, accepted as Haworthia mucronata Haw. var. inconfluens (Poelln.) M.B.Bayer, endemic
 Haworthia intermedia Poelln. accepted as Haworthia mirabilis (Haw.) Haw. var. notabilis (Poelln.) M.B.Bayer, indigenous
 Haworthia intermedia Poelln. accepted as Haworthia reticulata (Haw.) Haw. var. reticulata, indigenous
 Haworthia intermedia Poelln. accepted as Haworthia reticulata (Haw.) Haw. var. reticulata	
 Haworthia isabellae Poelln. accepted as Haworthia cooperi Baker var. isabellae (Poelln.) M.B.Bayer, indigenous
 Haworthia isabellae Poelln. var. arabesqua (M.Hayashi) Breuer, accepted as Haworthia cooperi Baker var. isabellae (Poelln.) M.B.Bayer, indigenous
 Haworthia isabellae Poelln. var. bella (M.Hayashi) Breuer, accepted as Haworthia cooperi Baker var. isabellae (Poelln.) M.B.Bayer, indigenous
 Haworthia isabellae Poelln. var. ligulata (M.Hayashi) Breuer, accepted as Haworthia cooperi Baker var. gordoniana (Poelln.) M.B.Bayer, indigenous
 Haworthia jacobseniana Poelln. accepted as Haworthiopsis glauca (Baker) G.D.Rowley var. herrei (Poelln.) G.D.Rowley, indigenous
 Haworthia jadea M.Hayashi, accepted as Haworthia bayeri J.D.Venter & S.A.Hammer, indigenous
 Haworthia jakubii Breuer, accepted as Haworthia mirabilis (Haw.) Haw. var. paradoxa (Poelln.) M.B.Bayer, indigenous
 Haworthia jansenvillensis Breuer, accepted as Haworthia decipiens Poelln. var. virella M.B.Bayer, indigenous
 Haworthia jansenvillensis Breuer var. crinita (M.Hayashi) Breuer, accepted as Haworthia decipiens Poelln. var. virella M.B.Bayer, indigenous
 Haworthia jansenvillensis Breuer var. eminens (M.Hayashi) Breuer, accepted as Haworthia decipiens Poelln. var. virella M.B.Bayer, indigenous
 Haworthia jansenvillensis Breuer var. flavida (M.Hayashi) Breuer, accepted as Haworthia decipiens Poelln. var. xiphiophylla (Baker) M.B.Bayer, indigenous
 Haworthia jansenvillensis Breuer var. fluffa (M.Hayashi) Breuer, accepted as Haworthia decipiens Poelln. var. virella M.B.Bayer, indigenous
 Haworthia jansenvillensis Breuer var. mollis (M.Hayashi) Breuer, accepted as Haworthia decipiens Poelln. var. virella M.B.Bayer, indigenous
 Haworthia jansenvillensis Breuer var. regina (M.Hayashi) Breuer, accepted as Haworthia decipiens Poelln. var. virella M.B.Bayer, indigenous
 Haworthia janvlokii (Breuer) Breuer, accepted as Haworthia emelyae Poelln. var. emelyae, indigenous
 Haworthia jeffreis M.Hayashi, accepted as Haworthia cooperi Baker var. gordoniana (Poelln.) M.B.Bayer, indigenous
 Haworthia joeyae C.L.Scott, accepted as Haworthia cooperi Baker var. dielsiana (Poelln.) M.B.Bayer, indigenous
 Haworthia johanii (M.Hayashi) Breuer, accepted as Haworthiopsis scabra (Haw.) G.D.Rowley var. scabra, indigenous
 Haworthia joleneae M.Hayashi, accepted as Haworthia mirabilis (Haw.) Haw. var. badia (Poelln.) M.B.Bayer, indigenous
 Haworthia jonesiae Poelln. accepted as Haworthiopsis glauca (Baker) G.D.Rowley var. herrei (Poelln.) G.D.Rowley, indigenous
 Haworthia joubertii M.Hayashi, accepted as Haworthia arachnoidea (L.) Duval var. arachnoidea, indigenous
 Haworthia kemari M.Hayashi, accepted as Haworthia decipiens Poelln. var. virella M.B.Bayer, endemic
 Haworthia kingiana Poelln. accepted as Tulista kingiana (Poelln.) Gideon F.Sm. & Molteno, endemic
 Haworthia koelmaniorum Oberm. & D.S.Hardy, accepted as Haworthiopsis koelmaniorum (Oberm. & D.S.Hardy) Boatwr. & J.C.Manning, endemic
 Haworthia koelmaniorum Oberm. & D.S.Hardy var. mcmurtryi (C.L.Scott) M.B.Bayer, accepted as Haworthiopsis koelmaniorum (Oberm. & D.S.Hardy) Boatwr. & J.C.Manning var. mcmurtryi (C.L.Scott) Gil, endemic
 Haworthia kogmansensis M.Hayashi, accepted as Haworthia arachnoidea (L.) Duval var. setata (Haw.) M.B.Bayer, indigenous
 Haworthia kondoi M.Hayashi, accepted as Haworthia floribunda Poelln. var. major M.B.Bayer, indigenous
 Haworthia lachnosa M.Hayashi, accepted as Haworthia cooperi Baker var. isabellae (Poelln.) M.B.Bayer, indigenous
 Haworthia laeta M.Hayashi, accepted as Haworthia bayeri J.D.Venter & S.A.Hammer, indigenous
 Haworthia laetivirens Haw. accepted as Haworthia retusa (L.) Duval var. turgida (Haw.) M.B.Bayer, indigenous
 Haworthia laevis Haw. accepted as Tulista marginata (Lam.) G.D.Rowley, indigenous
 Haworthia lapis Breuer & M.Hayashi, accepted as Haworthia aristata Haw. indigenous
 Haworthia lapis Breuer & M.Hayashi var. rava (M.Hayashi) Breuer, accepted as Haworthia aristata Haw. indigenous
 Haworthia lateganiae Poelln., accepted as Haworthiopsis scabra (Haw.) G.D.Rowley var. lateganiae (Poelln.) G.D.Rowley, indigenous
 Haworthia lavranii (C.L.Scott) Breuer, accepted as Haworthiopsis sordida (Haw.) G.D.Rowley var. lavranii (C.L.Scott) G.D.Rowley, indigenous
 Haworthia laxa M.Hayashi, accepted as Haworthia arachnoidea (L.) Duval var. arachnoidea, indigenous
 Haworthia lazulis M.Hayashi, accepted as Haworthia bolusii Baker var. pringlei (C.L.Scott) M.B.Bayer, indigenous
 Haworthia leightonii G.G.Sm. accepted as Haworthia cooperi Baker var. leightonii (G.G.Sm.) M.B.Bayer, indigenous
 Haworthia leightonii] G.G.Sm. var. davidii Breuer, accepted as Haworthia cooperi Baker var. leightonii (G.G.Sm.) M.B.Bayer, endemic
 Haworthia lepida G.G.Sm. accepted as Haworthia cymbiformis (Haw.) Duval var. cymbiformis, indigenous
 Haworthia ligulata M.Hayashi, accepted as Haworthia cooperi Baker var. gordoniana (Poelln.) M.B.Bayer, indigenous
 Haworthia limbata M.Hayashi, accepted as Haworthia arachnoidea (L.) Duval var. arachnoidea, indigenous
 Haworthia limifolia Marloth, accepted as Haworthiopsis limifolia (Marloth) G.D.Rowley, indigenous
 Haworthia limifolia Marloth forma major (Resende) Pilbeam, accepted as Haworthiopsis limifolia (Marloth) G.D.Rowley var. limifolia, indigenous
 Haworthia limifolia Marloth forma marlothiana Resende, accepted as Haworthiopsis limifolia (Marloth) G.D.Rowley var. limifolia, indigenous
 Haworthia limifolia Marloth subsp. koelmaniorum (Oberm. & D.S.Hardy) Halda, accepted as Haworthiopsis koelmaniorum (Oberm. & D.S.Hardy) Boatwr. & J.C.Manning, indigenous
 Haworthia limifolia Marloth var. arcana Gideon F.Sm. & N.R.Crouch. accepted as Haworthiopsis limifolia (Marloth) G.D.Rowley var. arcana (Gideon F.Sm. & N.R.Crouch) G.D.Rowley, endemic
 Haworthia limifolia Marloth var. gigantea M.B.Bayer, accepted as Haworthiopsis limifolia (Marloth) G.D.Rowley var. gigantea (M.B.Bayer) G.D.Rowley, endemic
 Haworthia limifolia Marloth var. glaucophylla M.B.Bayer, accepted as Haworthiopsis limifolia (Marloth) G.D.Rowley var. glaucophylla (M.B.Bayer) Breuer, endemic
 Haworthia limifolia Marloth var. limifolia forma diploidea, accepted as Haworthiopsis limifolia (Marloth) G.D.Rowley var. limifolia, indigenous
 Haworthia limifolia Marloth var. limifolia forma tetraploidea, accepted as Haworthiopsis limifolia (Marloth) G.D.Rowley var. limifolia, indigenous
 Haworthia limifolia Marloth var. marlothiana (Resende) Resende, accepted as Haworthiopsis limifolia (Marloth) G.D.Rowley var. limifolia, indigenous
 Haworthia limifolia Marloth var. schuldtiana Resende, accepted as Haworthiopsis limifolia (Marloth) G.D.Rowley var. limifolia, indigenous
 Haworthia limifolia Marloth var. stolonifera Resende, accepted as Haworthiopsis limifolia (Marloth) G.D.Rowley var. limifolia
 Haworthia limifolia Marloth var. stolonifera Resende forma major, accepted as Haworthiopsis limifolia (Marloth) G.D.Rowley var. limifolia	
 Haworthia limifolia Marloth var. stolonifera Resende forma pigmentellii, accepted as Haworthiopsis limifolia (Marloth) G.D.Rowley var. limifolia
 Haworthia limifolia Marloth var. striata Pilbeam, accepted as Haworthiopsis limifolia (Marloth) G.D.Rowley var. limifolia, indigenous
 Haworthia lockwoodii Archibald, endemic
 Haworthia longiana Poelln. accepted as Haworthiopsis longiana (Poelln.) G.D.Rowley, endemic
 Haworthia longiana Poelln. var. albinota G.G.Sm. accepted as Haworthiopsis longiana (Poelln.) G.D.Rowley, indigenous
 Haworthia longiaristata Poelln. accepted as Haworthia decipiens Poelln. var. xiphiophylla (Baker) M.B.Bayer, indigenous
 Haworthia longibracteata G.G.Sm. accepted as Haworthia retusa (L.) Duval var. longibracteata (G.G.Sm.) M.B.Bayer, indigenous
 Haworthia lupula (M.B.Bayer) M.Hayashi, accepted as Haworthia herbacea (Mill.) Stearn var. lupula M.B.Bayer, indigenous
 Haworthia luri M.Hayashi, accepted as Haworthia cooperi Baker var. pilifera (Baker) M.B.Bayer, indigenous
 Haworthia luteorosea Uitewaal, accepted as Haworthia herbacea (Mill.) Stearn var. herbacea, indigenous
 Haworthia maculata (Poelln.) M.B.Bayer, endemic
 Haworthia maculata (Poelln.) M.B.Bayer var. intermedia (Poelln.) M.B.Bayer, accepted as Haworthia mirabilis (Haw.) Haw. var. notabilis (Poelln.) M.B.Bayer, endemic
 Haworthia maculata (Poelln.) M.B.Bayer var. livida (M.B.Bayer) M.B.Bayer, endemic
 Haworthia maculata (Poelln.) M.B.Bayer var. maculata, endemic
 Haworthia magnifica Poelln. accepted as Haworthia mirabilis (Haw.) Haw. var. magnifica (Poelln.) M.B.Bayer, indigenous
 Haworthia magnifica Poelln. var. acuminata (M.B.Bayer) M.B.Bayer, accepted as Haworthia pygmaea Poelln. var. acuminata (M.B.Bayer) M.B.Bayer, endemic
 Haworthia magnifica Poelln. var. asperula (Haw.) Breuer. accepted as Haworthia mirabilis (Haw.) Haw. var. maraisii (Poelln.) M.B.Bayer, endemic
 Haworthia magnifica Poelln. var. atrofusca (G.G.Sm.) M.B.Bayer, accepted as Haworthia mirabilis (Haw.) Haw. var. atrofusca (G.G.Sm.) M.B.Bayer, endemic
 Haworthia magnifica Poelln. var. dekenahii (G.G.Sm.) M.B.Bayer, accepted as Haworthia pygmaea Poelln. var. dekenahii (G.G.Sm.) M.B.Bayer, endemic
 Haworthia magnifica Poelln. var. intermedia (Poelln.) M.B.Bayer, accepted as Haworthia reticulata (Haw.) Haw. var. reticulata, indigenous
 Haworthia magnifica Poelln. var. major (G.G.Sm.) M.B.Bayer, accepted as Haworthia emelyae Poelln. var. major (G.G.Sm.) M.B.Bayer, indigenous
 Haworthia magnifica Poelln. var. maraisii (Poelln.) M.B.Bayer, accepted as Haworthia mirabilis (Haw.) Haw. var. maraisii (Poelln.) M.B.Bayer, indigenous
 Haworthia magnifica Poelln. var. meiringii (M.B.Bayer) M.B.Bayer, accepted as Haworthia mirabilis (Haw.) Haw. var. meiringii (M.B.Bayer) M.B.Bayer, indigenous
 Haworthia magnifica Poelln. var. notabilis M.B.Bayer, accepted as Haworthia mirabilis (Haw.) Haw. var. notabilis (Poelln.) M.B.Bayer, indigenous
 Haworthia magnifica Poelln. var. obserata (Marx) Breuer, accepted as Haworthia emelyae Poelln. var. multifolia M.B.Bayer, indigenous
 Haworthia magnifica Poelln. var. paradoxa (Poelln.) M.B.Bayer, accepted as Haworthia mirabilis (Haw.) Haw. var. paradoxa (Poelln.) M.B.Bayer, indigenous
 Haworthia magnifica Poelln. var. splendens S.A.Hammer & J.D.Venter, accepted as Haworthia mirabilis (Haw.) Haw. var. splendens (S.A.Hammer & J.D.Venter) M.B.Bayer, endemic
 Haworthia major (Aiton) Duval, accepted as Tulista minor (Aiton) Gideon F.Sm. & Molteno, indigenous
 Haworthia maraisii Poelln. accepted as Haworthia mirabilis (Haw.) Haw. var. maraisii (Poelln.) M.B.Bayer, indigenous
 Haworthia maraisii Poelln. var. magnifica (Poelln.) M.B.Bayer, accepted as Haworthia mirabilis (Haw.) Haw. var. magnifica (Poelln.) M.B.Bayer, indigenous
 Haworthia maraisii Poelln. var. major (G.G.Sm.) M.B.Bayer, accepted as Haworthia emelyae Poelln. var. major (G.G.Sm.) M.B.Bayer, indigenous
 Haworthia maraisii Poelln. var. meiringii M.B.Bayer, accepted as Haworthia mirabilis (Haw.) Haw. var. meiringii (M.B.Bayer) M.B.Bayer, endemic
 Haworthia maraisii Poelln. var. notabilis (Poelln.) M.B.Bayer, accepted as Haworthia mirabilis (Haw.) Haw. var. notabilis (Poelln.) M.B.Bayer, endemic
 Haworthia maraisii Poelln. var. paradoxa (Poelln.) M.B.Bayer, accepted as Haworthia mirabilis (Haw.) Haw. var. paradoxa (Poelln.) M.B.Bayer, indigenous
 Haworthia maraisii Poelln. var. schuldtiana (Poelln.) Breuer, accepted as Haworthia mirabilis (Haw.) Haw. var. maraisii (Poelln.) M.B.Bayer, indigenous
 Haworthia margaritifera (L.) Haw. accepted as Tulista pumila (L.) G.D.Rowley, indigenous
 Haworthia margaritifera (L.) Haw. var. corallina Baker, accepted as Tulista minor (Aiton) Gideon F.Sm. & Molteno, indigenous
 Haworthia margaritifera (L.) Haw. var. erecta (Haw.) Baker, accepted as Tulista minor (Aiton) Gideon F.Sm. & Molteno, indigenous
 Haworthia margaritifera (L.) Haw. var. granata (Willd.) Baker, accepted as Tulista minor (Aiton) Gideon F.Sm. & Molteno, indigenous
 Haworthia margaritifera (L.) Haw. var. maxima (Haw.) Uitewaal, accepted as Tulista pumila (L.) G.D.Rowley, indigenous
 Haworthia margaritifera (L.) Haw. var. semimargaritifera (Salm-Dyck) Baker, accepted as Tulista pumila (L.) G.D.Rowley, indigenous
 Haworthia marginata (Lam.) Stearn, accepted as Tulista marginata (Lam.) G.D.Rowley, endemic
 Haworthia marginata (Lam.) Stearn var. laevis (Haw.) H.Jacobsen, accepted as Tulista marginata (Lam.) G.D.Rowley, indigenous
 Haworthia marginata (Lam.) Stearn var. ramifera (Haw.) H.Jacobsen, accepted as Tulista marginata (Lam.) G.D.Rowley, indigenous
 Haworthia marginata (Lam.) Stearn var. virescens (Haw.) Uitewaal, accepted as Tulista marginata (Lam.) G.D.Rowley, indigenous
 Haworthia marmorata M.Hayashi, accepted as Haworthia marumiana Uitewaal var. marumiana, indigenous
 Haworthia marumiana Uitewaal, endemic
 Haworthia marumiana Uitewaal var. archeri (W.F.Barker ex M.B.Bayer) M.B.Bayer, endemic
 Haworthia marumiana Uitewaal var. batesiana (Uitewaal) M.B.Bayer, endemic
 Haworthia marumiana Uitewaal var. dimorpha (M.B.Bayer) M.B.Bayer, endemic
 Haworthia marumiana Uitewaal var. marmorata (M.Hayashi) Breuer, accepted as Haworthia marumiana Uitewaal var. marumiana, indigenous
 Haworthia marumiana Uitewaal var. marumiana, endemic
 Haworthia marumiana Uitewaal var. reddii (C.L.Scott) M.B.Bayer, endemic
 Haworthia marumiana Uitewaal var. viridis M.B.Bayer, endemic
 Haworthia marxii Gildenh. endemic
 Haworthia maughanii Poelln. accepted as Haworthia truncata Schonland var. maughanii (Poelln.) B.Fearn, indigenous
 Haworthia maxima (Haw.) Duval, accepted as Tulista pumila (L.) G.D.Rowley, endemic
 Haworthia mclarenii Poelln. accepted as Haworthia mucronata Haw. var. mucronata, indigenous
 Haworthia mcmurtryi C.L.Scott, accepted as Haworthiopsis koelmaniorum (Oberm. & D.S.Hardy) Boatwr. & J.C.Manning var. mcmurtryi (C.L.Scott) Gil, endemic
 Haworthia minima (Aiton) Haw. accepted as Tulista minor (Aiton) Gideon F.Sm. & Molteno, endemic
 Haworthia minima (Aiton) Haw. var. major Poelln. accepted as Haworthia arachnoidea (L.) Duval var. setata (Haw.) M.B.Bayer, indigenous
 Haworthia minima (Aiton) Haw. var. poellnitziana (Uitewaal) M.B.Bayer, accepted as Tulista minor (Aiton) Gideon F.Sm. & Molteno, endemic
 Haworthia minima Baker, accepted as Haworthia cooperi Baker var. tenera (Poelln.) M.B.Bayer, indigenous
 Haworthia minor  (Aiton) Duval, accepted as Tulista minor (Aiton) Gideon F.Sm. & Molteno, indigenous
 Haworthia minutissima Poelln. accepted as Haworthiopsis tessellata (Haw.) G.D.Rowley var. tessellata, indigenous
 Haworthia mirabilis (Haw.) Haw. endemic
 Haworthia mirabilis (Haw.) Haw. subsp. badia (Poelln.) M.B.Bayer, accepted as Haworthia mirabilis (Haw.) Haw. var. badia (Poelln.) M.B.Bayer, endemic
 Haworthia mirabilis (Haw.) Haw. subsp. mundula (G.G.Sm.) M.B.Bayer, accepted as Haworthia mirabilis (Haw.) Haw. var. mundula (G.G.Sm.) M.B.Bayer, indigenous
 Haworthia mirabilis (Haw.) Haw. var. atrofusca (G.G.Sm.) M.B.Bayer, endemic
 Haworthia mirabilis (Haw.) Haw. var. badia (Poelln.) M.B.Bayer, endemic
 Haworthia mirabilis (Haw.) Haw. var. beukmannii (Poelln.) M.B.Bayer, endemic
 Haworthia mirabilis (Haw.) Haw. var. calcarea M.B.Bayer, accepted as Haworthia rossouwii Poelln. var. calcarea (M.B.Bayer) M.B.Bayer, endemic
 Haworthia mirabilis (Haw.) Haw. var. consanguinea M.B.Bayer, endemic
 Haworthia mirabilis (Haw.) Haw. var. depauperata (Poelln.) Breuer, accepted as Haworthia mirabilis (Haw.) Haw. var. triebneriana (Poelln.) M.B.Bayer, indigenous
 Haworthia mirabilis (Haw.) Haw. var. heidelbergensis (G.G.Sm.) M.B.Bayer, endemic
 Haworthia mirabilis (Haw.) Haw. var. magnifica (Poelln.) M.B.Bayer, endemic
 Haworthia mirabilis (Haw.) Haw. var. maraisii (Poelln.) M.B.Bayer, endemic
 Haworthia mirabilis (Haw.) Haw. var. meiringii (M.B.Bayer) M.B.Bayer, endemic
 Haworthia mirabilis (Haw.) Haw. var. mirabilis, endemic
 Haworthia mirabilis (Haw.) Haw. var. mundula (G.G.Sm.) M.B.Bayer, endemic
 Haworthia mirabilis (Haw.) Haw. var. notabilis (Poelln.) M.B.Bayer, endemic
 Haworthia mirabilis (Haw.) Haw. var. paradoxa (Poelln.) M.B.Bayer, endemic
 Haworthia mirabilis (Haw.) Haw. var. scabra (M.B.Bayer) M.B.Bayer, endemic
 Haworthia mirabilis (Haw.) Haw. var. splendens (S.A.Hammer & J.D.Venter) M.B.Bayer, endemic
 Haworthia mirabilis (Haw.) Haw. var. sublineata (Poelln.) M.B.Bayer, endemic
 Haworthia mirabilis (Haw.) Haw. var. toonensis (M.B.Bayer) M.B.Bayer, endemic
 Haworthia mirabilis (Haw.) Haw. var. triebneriana (Poelln.) M.B.Bayer, endemic
 Haworthia modesta (M.B.Bayer) M.Hayashi, accepted as Haworthia variegata L.Bolus var. modesta M.B.Bayer, indigenous
 Haworthia mollis M.Hayashi, accepted as Haworthia decipiens Poelln. var. virella M.B.Bayer, indigenous
 Haworthia montana M.Hayashi, accepted as Haworthia nortieri G.G.Sm. var. nortieri, indigenous
 Haworthia monticola Fourc. endemic
 Haworthia monticola Fourc. var. asema M.B.Bayer, endemic
 Haworthia monticola Fourc. var. bronkhorstii, accepted as Haworthia monticola Fourc. var. monticola, endemic
 Haworthia monticola Fourc. var. monticola, endemic
 Haworthia morrisiae Poelln. accepted as Haworthiopsis scabra (Haw.) G.D.Rowley var. morrisiae (Poelln.) G.D.Rowley, indigenous
 Haworthia mucronata Haw., endemic
 Haworthia mucronata Haw. var. calitzdorpensis Breuer, accepted as Haworthia arachnoidea (L.) Duval var. calitzdorpensis (Breuer) Breuer, endemic
 Haworthia mucronata Haw. var. habdomadis (Poelln.) M.B.Bayer, endemic
 Haworthia mucronata Haw. var. inconfluens (Poelln.) M.B.Bayer, endemic
 Haworthia mucronata Haw. var. limpida (Haw.) Poelln. forma inconfluens, accepted as Haworthia mucronata Haw. var. inconfluens (Poelln.) M.B.Bayer, indigenous
 Haworthia mucronata Haw. var. morrisiae (Poelln.) Poelln. endemic
 Haworthia mucronata Haw. var. mucronata, endemic
 Haworthia mucronata Haw. var. rooibergensis Esterhuizen & Battista, accepted as Haworthia mucronata Haw. var. inconfluens (Poelln.) M.B.Bayer, endemic
 Haworthia mucronata Haw. var. rycroftiana (M.B.Bayer) M.B.Bayer, endemic
 Haworthia multifolia (M.B.Bayer) M.Hayashi, accepted as Haworthia emelyae Poelln. var. multifolia M.B.Bayer, indigenous
 Haworthia multifolia (M.B.Bayer) M.Hayashi var. breueri (M.Hayashi) Breuer, accepted as Haworthia emelyae Poelln. var. emelyae, indigenous
 Haworthia multifolia (M.B.Bayer) M.Hayashi var. major (G.G.Sm.) Breuer, accepted as Haworthia emelyae Poelln. var. major (G.G.Sm.) M.B.Bayer, indigenous
 Haworthia multilineata (G.G.Sm.) C.L.Scott, accepted as Haworthia retusa (L.) Duval var. retusa, indigenous
 Haworthia mundula G.G.Sm. accepted as Haworthia mirabilis (Haw.) Haw. var. mundula (G.G.Sm.) M.B.Bayer, indigenous
 Haworthia mundula G.G.Sm. var. calcarea (M.B.Bayer) Breuer, accepted as Haworthia rossouwii Poelln. var. calcarea (M.B.Bayer) M.B.Bayer, indigenous
 Haworthia musculina  G.G.Sm. accepted as Haworthiopsis coarctata (Haw.) G.D.Rowley var. coarctata, indigenous
 Haworthia mutabilis Poelln. accepted as Tulista minor (Aiton) Gideon F.Sm. & Molteno, indigenous
 Haworthia mutica Haw. endemic
 Haworthia mutica Haw. var. nigra M.B.Bayer, accepted as Haworthia retusa (L.) Duval var. nigra (M.B.Bayer) M.B.Bayer, endemic
 Haworthia namaquensis (M.B.Bayer) Breuer, accepted as Haworthia arachnoidea (L.) Duval var. namaquensis M.B.Bayer, endemic
 Haworthia nigra (Haw.) Baker, accepted as Haworthiopsis nigra (Haw.) G.D.Rowley, indigenous
 Haworthia nigra (Haw.) Baker var. angustata (Poelln.) Uitewaal, accepted as Haworthiopsis nigra (Haw.) G.D.Rowley var. nigra, indigenous
 Haworthia nigra (Haw.) Baker var. diversifolia (Poelln.) Uitewaal, accepted as Haworthiopsis nigra (Haw.) G.D.Rowley var. diversifolia (Poelln.) G.D.Rowley, endemic
 Haworthia nigra (Haw.) Baker var. diversifolia Poelln. forma nana, accepted as Haworthiopsis nigra (Haw.) G.D.Rowley var. diversifolia (Poelln.) G.D.Rowley, indigenous
 Haworthia nigra (Haw.) Baker var. elongata (Poelln.) Uitewaal, accepted as Haworthiopsis nigra (Haw.) G.D.Rowley var. elongata (Poelln.) G.D.Rowley, indigenous
 Haworthia nigra (Haw.) Baker var. pusilla (Poelln.) Uitewaal, accepted as Haworthiopsis nigra (Haw.) G.D.Rowley var. nigra, indigenous
 Haworthia nigra (Haw.) Baker var. schmidtiana (Poelln.) Uitewaal, accepted as Haworthia nortieri G.G.Sm. var. nortieri, indigenous
 Haworthia nigra (Haw.) Baker var. suberecta (Poelln.) Uitewaal, accepted as Haworthiopsis nigra (Haw.) G.D.Rowley var. nigra, indigenous
 Haworthia nigra (Haw.) Poelln. forma angustata (Poelln.) Pilbeam, accepted as Haworthiopsis nigra (Haw.) G.D.Rowley var. nigra, indigenous
 Haworthia nigra (Haw.) Poelln. forma nana (Poelln.) Pilbeam, accepted as Haworthiopsis nigra (Haw.) G.D.Rowley var. diversifolia (Poelln.) G.D.Rowley, indigenous
 Haworthia nigrata M.Hayashi, accepted as Haworthia arachnoidea (L.) Duval var. nigricans (Haw.) M.B.Bayer, indigenous
 Haworthia nitidula Poelln. accepted as Haworthia mirabilis (Haw.) Haw. var. triebneriana (Poelln.) M.B.Bayer, indigenous
 Haworthia nitidula Poelln. var. opaca Poelln. accepted as Haworthia mirabilis (Haw.) Haw. var. notabilis (Poelln.) M.B.Bayer, indigenous
 Haworthia nortieri G.G.Sm. endemic
 Haworthia nortieri G.G.Sm. var. agnis (Battista) Breuer, accepted as Haworthia nortieri G.G.Sm. var. nortieri, indigenous
 Haworthia nortieri G.G.Sm. var. albispina (M.Hayashi) M.B.Bayer, endemic
 Haworthia nortieri G.G.Sm. var. devriesii (Breuer) M.B.Bayer, endemic
 Haworthia nortieri G.G.Sm. var. giftbergensis G.G.Sm. accepted as Haworthia nortieri G.G.Sm. var. nortieri, indigenous
 Haworthia nortieri G.G.Sm. var. globosiflora (G.G.Sm.) M.B.Bayer, endemic
 Haworthia nortieri G.G.Sm. var. montana (M.Hayashi) Breuer, accepted as Haworthia nortieri G.G.Sm. var. nortieri, indigenous
 Haworthia nortieri G.G.Sm. var. montana G.G.Sm. accepted as Haworthia nortieri G.G.Sm. var. nortieri
 Haworthia nortieri G.G.Sm. var. nortieri, endemic
 Haworthia nortieri G.G.Sm. var. pehlemanniae (C.L.Scott) M.B.Bayer, endemic
 Haworthia notabilis Poelln, accepted as Haworthia mirabilis (Haw.) Haw. var. notabilis (Poelln.) M.B.Bayer, indigenous
 Haworthia notabilis Poelln. var. diversicolor (Triebner & Poelln.) Breuer, accepted as Haworthia mirabilis (Haw.) Haw. var. triebneriana (Poelln.) M.B.Bayer, indigenous
 Haworthia obesa (Poelln.) Breuer, accepted as Haworthia cymbiformis (Haw.) Duval var. setulifera (Poelln.) M.B.Bayer, indigenous
 Haworthia obserata Marx, accepted as Haworthia emelyae Poelln. var. multifolia M.B.Bayer, indigenous
 Haworthia obtusa Haw. accepted as Haworthia cymbiformis (Haw.) Duval var. obtusa (Haw.) Baker, indigenous
 Haworthia obtusa Haw. var. dielsiana (Poelln.) Uitewaal, accepted as Haworthia cooperi Baker var. dielsiana (Poelln.) M.B.Bayer, indigenous
 Haworthia obtusa Haw. var. dielsiana (Poelln.) Uitewaal forma acuminata, accepted as Haworthia cooperi Baker var. pilifera (Baker) M.B.Bayer, indigenous
 Haworthia obtusa Haw. var. gordoniana (Poelln.) Uitewaal, accepted as Haworthia cooperi Baker var. gordoniana (Poelln.) M.B.Bayer, indigenous
 Haworthia obtusa Haw. var. pilifera (Baker) Uitewaal, accepted as Haworthia cooperi Baker var. pilifera (Baker) M.B.Bayer, indigenous
 Haworthia obtusa Haw. var. pilifera (Baker) Uitewaal forma truncata, accepted as Haworthia cooperi Baker var. truncata (H.Jacobsen) M.B.Bayer, indigenous
 Haworthia obtusa Haw. var. salina (Poelln.) Uitewaal, accepted as Haworthia cooperi Baker var. pilifera (Baker) M.B.Bayer, indigenous
 Haworthia obtusa Haw. var. stayneri (Poelln.) Uitewaal, accepted as Haworthia cooperi Baker var. pilifera (Baker) M.B.Bayer, indigenous
 Haworthia oculata M.Hayashi, accepted as Haworthia cooperi Baker var. picturata (M.B.Bayer) M.B.Bayer, indigenous
 Haworthia odetteae Breuer, accepted as Haworthia bolusii Baker var. bolusii, endemic
 Haworthia odetteae Breuer var. odyssei (M.Hayashi) Breuer, accepted as Haworthia bolusii Baker var. bolusii, indigenous
 Haworthia odyssei M.Hayashi, accepted as Haworthia bolusii Baker var. bolusii, indigenous
 Haworthia okhuwae M.Hayashi, accepted as Tulista pumila (L.) G.D.Rowley, indigenous
 Haworthia olivacea (G.G.Sm.) Breuer, accepted as Haworthiopsis reinwardtii (Salm-Dyck) G.D.Rowley var. reinwardtii forma olivacea, indigenous
 Haworthia olivettiana Parr, accepted as × Astrolista bicarinata (Haw.) Molteno & Figueiredo, indigenous
 Haworthia opalina M.Hayashi, accepted as Tulista minor (Aiton) Gideon F.Sm. & Molteno, endemic
 Haworthia otzenii G.G.Sm. accepted as Haworthia mutica Haw. indigenous
 Haworthia outeniquensis M.B.Bayer, endemic
 Haworthia pallens Breuer & M.Hayashi, accepted as Haworthia cooperi Baker var. cooperi, indigenous
 Haworthia pallida Haw. accepted as Haworthia herbacea (Mill.) Stearn var. herbacea, indigenous
 Haworthia pallida Haw. var. paynei (L.Bolus) L.Bolus, accepted as Haworthia herbacea (Mill.) Stearn var. herbacea, indigenous
 Haworthia pallidifolia (G.G.Sm.) Breuer, accepted as Haworthia retusa (L.) Duval var. suberecta (Poelln.) M.B.Bayer, indigenous
 Haworthia papillaris Breuer, accepted as Haworthia truncata Schonland var. truncata, indigenous
 Haworthia papillosa (Salm-Dyck) Haw. accepted as Tulista pumila (L.) G.D.Rowley, indigenous
 Haworthia papillosa (Salm-Dyck) Haw. var. semipapillosa Haw. accepted as Tulista pumila (L.) G.D.Rowley, indigenous
 Haworthia paradoxa  Poelln. accepted as Haworthia mirabilis (Haw.) Haw. var. paradoxa (Poelln.) M.B.Bayer	indig
 Haworthia paradoxa Poelln. var. jakubii (Breuer) Breuer, accepted as Haworthia mirabilis (Haw.) Haw. var. paradoxa (Poelln.) M.B.Bayer, indigenous
 Haworthia parksiana Poelln. endemic
 Haworthia parksiana Poelln. var. dentata (M.B.Bayer) Breuer, accepted as Haworthia floribunda Poelln. var. dentata M.B.Bayer, indigenous
 Haworthia parva Haw. accepted as Haworthiopsis tessellata (Haw.) G.D.Rowley var. tessellata, indigenous
 Haworthia paucifolia (G.G.Sm.) M.Hayashi, accepted as Haworthia angustifolia Haw. var. paucifolia G.G.Sm., indigenous
 Haworthia paynei Poelln. accepted as Haworthia herbacea (Mill.) Stearn var. herbacea, indigenous
 Haworthia peacockii Baker, accepted as Haworthiopsis coarctata (Haw.) G.D.Rowley var. coarctata, indigenous
 Haworthia pearsonii C.H.Wright, accepted as Haworthia arachnoidea (L.) Duval var. arachnoidea
 Haworthia pectinis M.Hayashi, accepted as Haworthia arachnoidea (L.) Duval var. setata (Haw.) M.B.Bayer, indigenous
 Haworthia pehlemanniae C.L.Scott, accepted as Haworthia nortieri G.G.Sm. var. pehlemanniae (C.L.Scott) M.B.Bayer, indigenous
 Haworthia pehlemanniae C.L.Scott var. albispina (M.Hayashi) Breuer, accepted as Haworthia nortieri G.G.Sm. var. albispina (M.Hayashi) M.B.Bayer, indigenous
 Haworthia pellucens Haw. accepted as Haworthia herbacea (Mill.) Stearn var. herbacea, indigenous
 Haworthia pellucida M.Hayashi, accepted as Haworthia decipiens Poelln. var. virella M.B.Bayer, indigenous
 Haworthia pentagona (Aiton) Haw. accepted as Astroloba spiralis (L.) Uitewaal
 Haworthia pentagona (Aiton) Haw. var. spiralis (Salm-Dyck) Parr, accepted as Astroloba spiralis (L.) Uitewaal
 Haworthia pentagona Haw. var. spirella (Haw.) Parr, accepted as Astroloba spiralis (L.) Uitewaal
 Haworthia pentagona Haw. var. torulosa (Haw.) Parr, accepted as Astroloba spiralis (L.) Uitewaal
 Haworthia petrophila (M.B.Bayer) M.Hayashi, accepted as Haworthia rossouwii Poelln. var. minor (M.B.Bayer) M.B.Bayer, indigenous
 Haworthia picta Poelln. accepted as Haworthia emelyae Poelln. var. emelyae, indigenous
 Haworthia picta Poelln. var. comptoniana (G.G.Sm.) Breuer, accepted as Haworthia emelyae Poelln. var. comptoniana (G.G.Sm.) J.D.Venter & S.A.Hammer, indigenous
 Haworthia picta Poelln. var. janvlokii Breuer, accepted as Haworthia emelyae Poelln. var. emelyae, endemic
 Haworthia picta Poelln. var. tricolor Breuer, accepted as Haworthia emelyae Poelln. var. emelyae, endemic
 Haworthia picturata (M.B.Bayer) M.Hayashi, accepted as Haworthia cooperi Baker var. picturata (M.B.Bayer) M.B.Bayer, indigenous
 Haworthia picturata (M.B.Bayer) M.Hayashi var. pusilla (M.Hayashi) Breuer, accepted as Haworthia cooperi Baker var. gordoniana (Poelln.) M.B.Bayer, indigenous
 Haworthia pilifera Baker, accepted as Haworthia cooperi Baker var. pilifera (Baker) M.B.Bayer, indigenous
 Haworthia pilifera Baker var. dielsiana (Poelln.) M.B.Bayer, accepted as Haworthia cooperi Baker var. dielsiana (Poelln.) M.B.Bayer, indigenous
 Haworthia pilifera Baker var. dielsiana (Poelln.) M.B.Bayer forma acuminata, accepted as Haworthia cooperi Baker var. pilifera (Baker) M.B.Bayer, indigenous
 Haworthia pilifera Baker var. gordoniana (Poelln.) Poelln. accepted as Haworthia cooperi Baker var. gordoniana (Poelln.) M.B.Bayer, indigenous
 Haworthia pilifera Baker var. salina (Poelln.) Poelln. accepted as Haworthia cooperi Baker var. pilifera (Baker) M.B.Bayer, indigenous
 Haworthia pilifera Baker var. stayneri (Poelln.) Poelln. accepted as Haworthia cooperi Baker var. pilifera (Baker) M.B.Bayer, indigenous
 Haworthia pilosa M.Hayashi, accepted as Haworthia cooperi Baker var. isabellae (Poelln.) M.B.Bayer, indigenous
 Haworthia pilosa M.Hayashi var. ciliata (M.Hayashi) Breuer, accepted as Haworthia cooperi Baker var. isabellae (Poelln.) M.B.Bayer, indigenous
 Haworthia pilosa M.Hayashi var. lachnosa (M.Hayashi) Breuer, accepted as Haworthia cooperi Baker var. isabellae (Poelln.) M.B.Bayer, indigenous
 Haworthia planifolia Haw. accepted as Haworthia cymbiformis (Haw.) Duval var. cymbiformis, indigenous
 Haworthia planifolia Haw. var. exulata Poelln. accepted as Haworthia cymbiformis (Haw.) Duval var. cymbiformis, indigenous
 Haworthia planifolia Haw. var. incrassata Poelln. accepted as Haworthia cymbiformis (Haw.) Duval var. cymbiformis, indigenous
 Haworthia planifolia Haw. var. longifolia Triebner & Poelln. accepted as Haworthia cymbiformis (Haw.) Duval var. cymbiformis, indigenous
 Haworthia planifolia Haw. var. longifolia Triebner & Poelln. forma calochlora, accepted as Haworthia cymbiformis (Haw.) Duval var. cymbiformis, indigenous
 Haworthia planifolia Haw. var. planifolia forma agavoides, accepted as Haworthia cymbiformis (Haw.) Duval var. cymbiformis, indigenous
 Haworthia planifolia Haw. var. planifolia forma olivacea, accepted as Haworthia cymbiformis (Haw.) Duval var. cymbiformis, indigenous
 Haworthia planifolia Haw. var. planifolia forma robusta, accepted as Haworthia cymbiformis (Haw.) Duval var. cymbiformis, indigenous
 Haworthia planifolia Haw. var. poellnitziana Resende, accepted as Haworthia cymbiformis (Haw.) Duval var. cymbiformis, indigenous
 Haworthia planifolia Haw. var. setulifera Poelln. accepted as Haworthia cymbiformis (Haw.) Duval var. setulifera (Poelln.) M.B.Bayer, indigenous
 Haworthia planifolia Haw. var. sublaevis Poelln. accepted as Haworthia cymbiformis (Haw.) Duval var. cymbiformis, indigenous
 Haworthia planifolia Haw. var. transiens Poelln. accepted as Haworthia transiens (Poelln.) M.Hayashi, indigenous
 Haworthia poellnitziana  Uitewaal, accepted as Tulista minor (Aiton) Gideon F.Sm. & Molteno, endemic
 Haworthia pringlei C.L.Scott, accepted as Haworthia bolusii Baker var. pringlei (C.L.Scott) M.B.Bayer, indigenous
 Haworthia pringlei C.L.Scott var. hastata (M.Hayashi) Breuer, accepted as Haworthia bolusii Baker var. pringlei (C.L.Scott) M.B.Bayer, indigenous
 Haworthia pseudogranulata Poelln. accepted as Haworthiopsis tessellata (Haw.) G.D.Rowley
 Haworthia pseudotessellata Poelln. accepted as Haworthiopsis tessellata (Haw.) G.D.Rowley var. tessellata, indigenous
 Haworthia pseudotortuosa (Salm-Dyck) Haw. accepted as Haworthiopsis viscosa (L.) Gildenh. & Klopper var. viscosa, indigenous
 Haworthia pubescens M.B.Bayer, endemic
 Haworthia pubescens M.B.Bayer var. livida M.B.Bayer, accepted as Haworthia maculata (Poelln.) M.B.Bayer var. livida (M.B.Bayer) M.B.Bayer, endemic
 Haworthia pulchella M.B.Bayer, endemic
 Haworthia pulchella M.B.Bayer var. globifera M.B.Bayer, endemic
 Haworthia pulchella M.B.Bayer var. pulchella, endemic
 Haworthia pumila (L.) Duval, accepted as Tulista pumila (L.) G.D.Rowley, indigenous
 Haworthia pumila (L.) M.B.Bayer subsp. attenuata (Haw.) Halda, accepted as Haworthiopsis attenuata (Haw.) G.D.Rowley, indigenous
 Haworthia pumila (L.) M.B.Bayer subsp. fasciata (Willd.) Halda, accepted as Haworthiopsis fasciata (Willd.) G.D.Rowley, indigenous
 Haworthia pumila (L.) M.B.Bayer subsp. longiana (Poelln.) Halda, accepted as Haworthiopsis longiana (Poelln.) G.D.Rowley, indigenous
 Haworthia pumila (L.) M.B.Bayer subsp. radula (Jacq.) Halda, accepted as Haworthiopsis attenuata (Haw.) G.D.Rowley var. radula (Jacq.) G.D.Rowley, indigenous
 Haworthia pumila (L.) M.B.Bayer var. smitii (Poelln.) Halda, accepted as Haworthiopsis scabra (Haw.) G.D.Rowley var. smitii (Poelln.) Gildenh. & Klopper, indigenous
 Haworthia pungens M.B.Bayer, accepted as Haworthiopsis pungens (M.B.Bayer) Boatwr. & J.C.Manning, endemic
 Haworthia pusilla M.Hayashi, accepted as Haworthia cooperi Baker var. gordoniana (Poelln.) M.B.Bayer, indigenous
 Haworthia pygmaea Poelln. endemic
 Haworthia pygmaea Poelln. var. acuminata (M.B.Bayer) M.B.Bayer, endemic
 Haworthia pygmaea Poelln. var. argenteomaculosa (G.G.Sm.) M.B.Bayer, endemic
 Haworthia pygmaea Poelln. var. dekenahii (G.G.Sm.) M.B.Bayer, endemic
 Haworthia pygmaea Poelln. var. esterhuizenii (M.Hayashi) Breuer, accepted as Haworthia pygmaea Poelln. var. dekenahii (G.G.Sm.) M.B.Bayer, indigenous
 Haworthia pygmaea Poelln. var. esterhuizenii (M.Hayashi) M.B.Bayer, accepted as Haworthia pygmaea Poelln. var. dekenahii (G.G.Sm.) M.B.Bayer, indigenous
 Haworthia pygmaea] Poelln. var. fusca (Breuer) M.B.Bayer, endemic
 Haworthia pygmaeaPoelln. var. pygmaea, endemic
 Haworthia pygmaea Poelln. var. vincentii (Breuer) M.B.Bayer, endemic
 Haworthia radula (Jacq.) Haw. accepted as Haworthiopsis attenuata (Haw.) G.D.Rowley var. radula (Jacq.) G.D.Rowley, indigenous
 Haworthia radula (Jacq.) Haw. var. asperior Haw. accepted as Haworthiopsis attenuata (Haw.) G.D.Rowley var. radula (Jacq.) G.D.Rowley, indigenous
 Haworthia radula (Jacq.) Haw. var. laevior Haw. accepted as Haworthiopsis attenuata (Haw.) G.D.Rowley var. radula (Jacq.) G.D.Rowley, indigenous
 Haworthia radula (Jacq.) Haw. var. pluriperlata Haw. accepted as Haworthiopsis attenuata (Haw.) G.D.Rowley var. radula (Jacq.) G.D.Rowley, indigenous
 Haworthia radula Haw. var. magniperlata Haw. accepted as Haworthiopsis attenuata (Haw.) G.D.Rowley var. attenuata, indigenous
 Haworthia ramifera Haw. accepted as Tulista marginata (Lam.) G.D.Rowley, indigenous
 Haworthia ramosa G.G.Sm. accepted as Haworthia cymbiformis (Haw.) Duval var. ramosa (G.G.Sm.) M.B.Bayer, indigenous
 Haworthia rava M.Hayashi, accepted as Haworthia aristata Haw. indigenous
 Haworthia recurva (Haw.) Haw. accepted as Haworthiopsis venosa (Lam.) G.D.Rowley, indigenous
 Haworthia reddii C.L.Scott, accepted as Haworthia marumiana Uitewaal var. reddii (C.L.Scott) M.B.Bayer, indigenous
 Haworthia regina M.Hayashi, accepted as Haworthia decipiens Poelln. var. virella M.B.Bayer, indigenous
 Haworthia reinwardtii (Salm-Dyck) Haw. accepted as Haworthiopsis reinwardtii (Salm-Dyck) G.D.Rowley, indigenous
 Haworthia reinwardtii (Salm-Dyck) Haw. subsp. coarctata (Haw.) Halda, accepted as Haworthiopsis coarctata (Haw.) G.D.Rowley indigenous
 Haworthia reinwardtii (Salm-Dyck) Haw. subsp. glauca (Baker) Halda, accepted as Haworthiopsis glauca (Baker) G.D.Rowley, indigenous
 Haworthia reinwardtii (Salm-Dyck) Haw. var. adelaidensis Poelln. accepted as Haworthiopsis coarctata (Haw.) G.D.Rowley var. adelaidensis (Poelln.) G.D.Rowley, indigenous
 Haworthia reinwardtii (Salm-Dyck) Haw. var. archibaldiae Poelln. accepted as Haworthiopsis reinwardtii (Salm-Dyck) G.D.Rowley var. reinwardtii forma reinwardtii, indigenous
 Haworthia reinwardtii (Salm-Dyck) Haw. var. bellula G.G.Sm. accepted as Haworthiopsis coarctata (Haw.) G.D.Rowley var. adelaidensis (Poelln.) G.D.Rowley, indigenous
 Haworthia reinwardtii (Salm-Dyck) Haw. var. brevicula G.G.Sm. accepted as Haworthiopsis reinwardtii (Salm-Dyck) G.D.Rowley var. brevicula (G.G.Sm.) G.D.Rowley, endemic
 Haworthia reinwardtii (Salm-Dyck) Haw. var. chalumnensis G.G.Sm. accepted as Haworthiopsis reinwardtii (Salm-Dyck) G.D.Rowley var. reinwardtii forma chalumnensis, indigenous
 Haworthia reinwardtii (Salm-Dyck) Haw. var. chalwinii (Marloth & A.Berger) Resende, accepted as Haworthiopsis coarctata (Haw.) G.D.Rowley var. coarctata, indigenous
 Haworthia reinwardtii (Salm-Dyck) Haw. var. committeesensis G.G.Sm. accepted as Haworthiopsis coarctata (Haw.) G.D.Rowley var. coarctata, indigenous
 Haworthia reinwardtii (Salm-Dyck) Haw. var. conspicua Poelln. accepted as Haworthiopsis coarctata (Haw.) G.D.Rowley var. coarctata, indigenous
 Haworthia reinwardtii (Salm-Dyck) Haw. var. diminuta G.G.Sm. accepted as Haworthiopsis reinwardtii (Salm-Dyck) G.D.Rowley var. brevicula (G.G.Sm.) G.D.Rowley, indigenous
 Haworthia reinwardtii (Salm-Dyck) Haw. var. fallax Poelln. accepted as Haworthiopsis coarctata (Haw.) G.D.Rowley var. coarctata, indigenous
 Haworthia reinwardtii (Salm-Dyck) Haw. var. grandicula G.G.Sm. accepted as Haworthiopsis reinwardtii (Salm-Dyck) G.D.Rowley var. reinwardtii forma reinwardtii, indigenous
 Haworthia reinwardtii (Salm-Dyck) Haw. var. greenii (Baker) Halda, accepted as Haworthiopsis coarctata (Haw.) G.D.Rowley var. coarctata, indigenous
 Haworthia reinwardtii (Salm-Dyck) Haw. var. haworthii Resende, accepted as Haworthiopsis reinwardtii (Salm-Dyck) G.D.Rowley var. reinwardtii forma reinwardtii, indigenous
 Haworthia reinwardtii (Salm-Dyck) Haw. var. herrei (Poelln.) Halda, accepted as Haworthiopsis glauca  (Baker) G.D.Rowley var. herrei (Poelln.) G.D.Rowley, indigenous
 Haworthia reinwardtii (Salm-Dyck) Haw. var. huntsdriftensis G.G.Sm. accepted as Haworthiopsis coarctata (Haw.) G.D.Rowley var. coarctata, indigenous
 Haworthia reinwardtii (Salm-Dyck) Haw. var. kaffirdriftensis G.G.Sm. accepted as Haworthiopsis reinwardtii (Salm-Dyck) G.D.Rowley var. reinwardtii forma kaffirdriftensis, indigenous
 Haworthia reinwardtii (Salm-Dyck) Haw. var. major Baker, accepted as Haworthiopsis reinwardtii (Salm-Dyck) G.D.Rowley var. reinwardtii forma reinwardtii, indigenous
 Haworthia reinwardtii (Salm-Dyck) Haw. var. olivacea G.G.Sm. accepted as Haworthiopsis reinwardtii (Salm-Dyck) G.D.Rowley var. reinwardtii forma olivacea, indigenous
 Haworthia reinwardtii (Salm-Dyck) Haw. var. peddiensis G.G.Sm. accepted as Tephrosia acaciifolia Baker, indigenous
 Haworthia reinwardtii (Salm-Dyck) Haw. var. pseudocoarctata Poelln. accepted as Haworthiopsis coarctata (Haw.) G.D.Rowley var. coarctata, indigenous
 Haworthia reinwardtii (Salm-Dyck) Haw. var. pulchra Poelln. accepted as Haworthiopsis reinwardtii (Salm-Dyck) G.D.Rowley var. reinwardtii forma reinwardtii, indigenous
 Haworthia reinwardtii (Salm-Dyck) Haw. var. reinwardtii forma chalumnensis, accepted as Haworthiopsis reinwardtii (Salm-Dyck) G.D.Rowley var. reinwardtii forma chalumnensis, endemic
 Haworthia reinwardtii (Salm-Dyck) Haw. var. reinwardtii forma kaffirdriftensis, accepted as Haworthiopsis reinwardtii (Salm-Dyck) G.D.Rowley var. reinwardtii forma kaffirdriftensis, endemic
 Haworthia reinwardtii (Salm-Dyck) Haw. var. reinwardtii forma olivacea, accepted as Haworthiopsis reinwardtii (Salm-Dyck) G.D.Rowley var. reinwardtii forma olivacea, endemic
 Haworthia reinwardtii (Salm-Dyck) Haw. var. reinwardtii forma zebrina, accepted as Haworthiopsis reinwardtii (Salm-Dyck) G.D.Rowley var. reinwardtii forma olivacea, endemic
 Haworthia reinwardtii (Salm-Dyck) Haw. var. riebeekensis G.G.Sm. accepted as Haworthiopsis coarctata (Haw.) G.D.Rowley var. adelaidensis (Poelln.) G.D.Rowley, indigenous
 [Haworthia reinwardtii (Salm-Dyck) Haw. var. tenuis G.G.Sm. accepted as Haworthiopsis coarctata (Haw.) G.D.Rowley var. tenuis (G.G.Sm.) G.D.Rowley, indigenous
 Haworthia reinwardtii (Salm-Dyck) Haw. var. triebnerii Resende, accepted as Haworthiopsis reinwardtii (Salm-Dyck) G.D.Rowley var. reinwardtii forma reinwardtii, indigenous
 Haworthia reinwardtii (Salm-Dyck) Haw. var. valida G.G.Sm. accepted as Haworthiopsis reinwardtii (Salm-Dyck) G.D.Rowley var. reinwardtii forma reinwardtii, indigenous
 Haworthia reinwardtii (Salm-Dyck) Haw. var. zebrina G.G.Sm. accepted as Haworthiopsis reinwardtii (Salm-Dyck) G.D.Rowley var. reinwardtii forma olivacea, indigenous
 Haworthia reticulata  (Haw.) Haw. endemic
 Haworthia reticulata (Haw.) Haw. var. acuminata Poelln. accepted as Haworthia reticulata (Haw.) Haw. var. reticulata, indigenous
 Haworthia reticulata (Haw.) Haw. var. attenuata M.B.Bayer, endemic
 Haworthia reticulata (Haw.) Haw. var. hurlingii (Poelln.) M.B.Bayer, endemic
 Haworthia reticulata (Haw.) Haw. var. reticulata, endemic
 Haworthia reticulata (Haw.) Haw. var. subregularis (Baker) Pilbeam, endemic
 Haworthia retusa (L.) Duval, endemic
 Haworthia retusa (L.) Duval forma acuminata M.B.Bayer, accepted as Haworthia pygmaea Poelln. var. acuminata (M.B.Bayer) M.B.Bayer, indigenous
 Haworthia retusa (L.) Duval forma argenteomaculosa (G.G.Sm.) M.B.Bayer, accepted as Haworthia pygmaea Poelln. var. argenteomaculosa (G.G.Sm.) M.B.Bayer, indigenous
 Haworthia retusa (L.) Duval var. acuminata (M.B.Bayer) M.B.Bayer, accepted as Haworthia pygmaea Poelln. var. acuminata (M.B.Bayer) M.B.Bayer, indigenous
 Haworthia retusa (L.) Duval var. dekenahii (G.G.Sm.) M.B.Bayer, accepted as Haworthia pygmaea Poelln. var. dekenahii (G.G.Sm.) M.B.Bayer, indigenous
 Haworthia retusa (L.) Duval var. densiflora G.G.Sm. accepted as Haworthia retusa (L.) Duval var. retusa, indigenous
 Haworthia retusa (L.) Duval var. longibracteata (G.G.Sm.) M.B.Bayer, endemic
 Haworthia retusa (L.) Duval var. multilineata G.G.Sm. accepted as Haworthia retusa (L.) Duval var. retusa, indigenous
 Haworthia retusa (L.) Duval var. nigra (M.B.Bayer) M.B.Bayer, endemic
 Haworthia retusa (L.) Duval var. quimutica M.Hayashi, accepted as Haworthia retusa (L.) Duval var. nigra (M.B.Bayer) M.B.Bayer, endemic
 Haworthia retusa (L.) Duval var. retusa, endemic
 Haworthia retusa (L.) Duval var. solitaria G.G.Sm. accepted as Haworthia retusa (L.) Duval var. retusa, indigenous
 Haworthia retusa (L.) Duval var. suberecta (Poelln.) M.B.Bayer, endemic
 Haworthia retusa (L.) Duval var. turgida (Haw.) M.B.Bayer, endemic
 Haworthia retusa Duval subsp. emelyae (Poelln.) Halda var. bruynsii, accepted as Haworthiopsis bruynsii (M.B.Bayer) G.D.Rowley, indigenous
 Haworthia retusa Duval var. fouchei (Poelln.) Breuer, accepted as Haworthia retusa (L.) Duval var. retusa, indigenous
 Haworthia retusa Duval var. fusca (Breuer) Breuer, accepted as Haworthia pygmaea Poelln. var. fusca (Breuer) M.B.Bayer, indigenous
 Haworthia rooibergensis (Esterhuizen & Battista) Breuer, accepted as Haworthia mucronata Haw. var. inconfluens (Poelln.) M.B.Bayer, indigenous
 Haworthia rooibergensis (Esterhuizen & Battista) Breuer var. erii (M.Hayashi) Breuer, accepted as Haworthia decipiens Poelln. var. cyanea M.B.Bayer, indigenous
 Haworthia rooivleiensis Breuer, accepted as Haworthia rossouwii Poelln. var. minor (M.B.Bayer) M.B.Bayer	indig
 Haworthia rossouwii Poelln. endemic
 Haworthia rossouwii Poelln. var. calcarea (M.B.Bayer) M.B.Bayer, endemic
 Haworthia rossouwii Poelln. var. elizeae (Breuer) M.B.Bayer, endemic
 Haworthia rossouwii Poelln. var. minor (M.B.Bayer) M.B.Bayer, endemic
 Haworthia rossouwii Poelln. var. petrophila (M.B.Bayer) M.B.Bayer, accepted as Haworthia rossouwii Poelln. var. minor (M.B.Bayer) M.B.Bayer, indigenous
 Haworthia rossouwii Poelln. var. rossouwii, endemic
 Haworthia rossouwii Poelln. var. scabra (M.B.Bayer) Breuer, accepted as Haworthia mirabilis (Haw.) Haw. var. scabra (M.B.Bayer) M.B.Bayer, indigenous
 Haworthia rossouwii Poelln. var. serrata (M.B.Bayer) Breuer, accepted as Haworthia rossouwii Poelln. var. rossouwii, indigenous
 Haworthia royalis M.Hayashi, accepted as Haworthia arachnoidea (L.) Duval var. setata (Haw.) M.B.Bayer, indigenous
 Haworthia rubriflora (L.Bolus) Parr, accepted as Astroloba rubriflora (L.Bolus) Gideon F.Sm. & J.C.Manning, indigenous
 Haworthia rubriflora (L.Bolus) Parr var. jacobseniana (Poelln.) Parr, accepted as Astroloba rubriflora (L.Bolus) Gideon F.Sm. & J.C.Manning, indigenous
 Haworthia rugosa (Salm-Dyck) Baker, accepted as Haworthiopsis attenuata (Haw.) G.D.Rowley var. attenuata, indigenous
 Haworthia rugosa (Salm-Dyck) Baker var. perviridis (Salm-Dyck) A.Berger, accepted as Haworthiopsis attenuata (Haw.) G.D.Rowley var. attenuata, indigenous
 Haworthia rycroftiana M.B.Bayer, accepted as Haworthia mucronata Haw. var. rycroftiana (M.B.Bayer) M.B.Bayer, indigenous
 Haworthia ryneveldii Poelln. accepted as Haworthiopsis nigra (Haw.) G.D.Rowley var. nigra, indigenous
 Haworthia sakai M.Hayashi, accepted as Haworthia mucronata Haw. var. morrisiae (Poelln.) Poelln. indigenous
 Haworthia salina (Poelln.) M.Hayashi, accepted as Haworthia cooperi Baker var. pilifera (Baker) M.B.Bayer, indigenous
 Haworthia salina (Poelln.) M.Hayashi var. venusta (C.L.Scott) Breuer, accepted as Haworthia cooperi Baker var. venusta (C.L.Scott) M.B.Bayer, indigenous
 Haworthia scabra Haw. accepted as Haworthiopsis scabra (Haw.) G.D.Rowley, indigenous
 Haworthia scabra Haw. subsp. granulata (Marloth) Halda, accepted as Haworthiopsis granulata (Marloth) G.D.Rowley, indigenous
 Haworthia scabra Haw. subsp. sordida (Haw.) Halda var. lavranii, accepted as Haworthiopsis sordida (Haw.) G.D.Rowley var. lavranii (C.L.Scott) G.D.Rowley, indigenous
 Haworthia scabra Haw. subsp. starkiana (Poelln.) Halda, accepted as Haworthiopsis scabra (Haw.) G.D.Rowley var. starkiana (Poelln.) G.D.Rowley, indigenous
 Haworthia scabra Haw. var. johanii M.Hayashi. accepted as Haworthiopsis scabra (Haw.) G.D.Rowley var. scabra, endemic
 Haworthia scabra Haw. var. lateganiae (Poelln.) M.B.Bayer, accepted as Haworthiopsis scabra (Haw.) G.D.Rowley var. lateganiae (Poelln.) G.D.Rowley, endemic
 Haworthia scabra Haw. var. morrisiae (Poelln.) M.B.Bayer, accepted as Haworthiopsis scabra (Haw.) G.D.Rowley var. morrisiae (Poelln.) G.D.Rowley, endemic
 Haworthia scabra Haw. var. starkiana (Poelln.) M.B.Bayer, accepted as Haworthiopsis scabra (Haw.) G.D.Rowley var. starkiana (Poelln.) G.D.Rowley, endemic
 Haworthia scabra Haw. var. tuberculata (Poelln.) Halda, accepted as Haworthiopsis scabra (Haw.) G.D.Rowley var. scabra	
 Haworthia scabra Haw. var. tuberculata (Poelln.) M.Hayashi, accepted as Haworthiopsis scabra (Haw.) G.D.Rowley var. scabra, indigenous
 Haworthia scabrida Breuer, accepted as Haworthia mirabilis (Haw.) Haw. var. scabra (M.B.Bayer) M.B.Bayer, indigenous
 Haworthia scabrispina (M.B.Bayer) Breuer, accepted as Haworthia arachnoidea (L.) Duval var. scabrispina M.B.Bayer, indigenous
 Haworthia schmidtiana G.G.Sm. accepted as Haworthia nortieri G.G.Sm. var. nortieri, indigenous
 Haworthia schmidtiana Poelln. accepted as Haworthiopsis nigra (Haw.) G.D.Rowley var. nigra, indigenous
 Haworthia schmidtiana Poelln. var. angustata Poelln. accepted as Haworthiopsis nigra (Haw.) G.D.Rowley var. nigra
 Haworthia schmidtiana Poelln. var. diversifolia (Poelln.) Poelln. accepted as Haworthiopsis nigra (Haw.) G.D.Rowley var. diversifolia (Poelln.) G.D.Rowley, indigenous
 Haworthia schmidtiana Poelln. var. diversifolia (Poelln.) Poelln. forma nana, accepted as Haworthiopsis nigra (Haw.) G.D.Rowley var. diversifolia (Poelln.) G.D.Rowley, indigenous
 Haworthia schmidtiana Poelln. var. elongata Poelln. accepted as Haworthiopsis nigra (Haw.) G.D.Rowley var. elongata (Poelln.) G.D.Rowley, indigenous
 Haworthia schmidtiana Poelln. var. pusilla Poelln. accepted as Haworthiopsis nigra (Haw.) G.D.Rowley var. nigra, indigenous
 Haworthia schmidtiana Poelln. var. suberectata Poelln. accepted as Haworthiopsis nigra (Haw.) G.D.Rowley var. nigra, indigenous
 Haworthia schoemanii M.Hayashi, accepted as Haworthiopsis granulata (Marloth) G.D.Rowley, endemic
 Haworthia schuldtiana Poelln. accepted as Haworthia mirabilis (Haw.) Haw. var. maraisii (Poelln.) M.B.Bayer, indigenous
 Haworthia schuldtiana Poelln. var. erecta Triebner & Poelln. accepted as Haworthia mirabilis (Haw.) Haw. var. notabilis (Poelln.) M.B.Bayer, indigenous
 Haworthia schuldtiana Poelln. var. maculata Poelln. accepted as Haworthia maculata (Poelln.) M.B.Bayer var. maculata, indigenous
 Haworthia schuldtiana Poelln. var. major G.G.Sm. accepted as Haworthia emelyae Poelln. var. major (G.G.Sm.) M.B.Bayer, indigenous
 Haworthia schuldtiana Poelln. var. minor Triebner & Poelln. accepted as Haworthia mirabilis (Haw.) Haw. var. maraisii (Poelln.) M.B.Bayer, indigenous
 Haworthia schuldtiana Poelln. var. robertsonensis Poelln. accepted as Haworthia mirabilis (Haw.) Haw. var. maraisii (Poelln.) M.B.Bayer, indigenous
 Haworthia schuldtiana Poelln. var. simplicior Poelln. accepted as Haworthia mirabilis (Haw.) Haw. var. maraisii (Poelln.) M.B.Bayer, indigenous
 Haworthia schuldtiana Poelln. var. sublaevis Poelln. accepted as Haworthia mirabilis (Haw.) Haw. var. maraisii (Poelln.) M.B.Bayer, indigenous
 Haworthia schuldtiana Poelln. var. subtuberculata Poelln. accepted as Haworthia mirabilis (Haw.) Haw. var. maraisii (Poelln.) M.B.Bayer, indigenous
 Haworthia schuldtiana Poelln. var. unilineata Poelln. accepted as Haworthia mirabilis (Haw.) Haw. var. maraisii (Poelln.) M.B.Bayer, indigenous
 Haworthia schuldtiana Poelln. var. whitesloaneana (Poelln.) Poelln. accepted as Haworthia mirabilis (Haw.) Haw. var. maraisii (Poelln.) M.B.Bayer, indigenous
 Haworthia scottii Breuer, accepted as Haworthia arachnoidea (L.) Duval var. nigricans (Haw.) M.B.Bayer, endemic
 Haworthia semiglabrata Haw. accepted as Tulista pumila (L.) G.D.Rowley, indigenous
 Haworthia semiviva (Poelln.) M.B.Bayer, endemic
 Haworthia serrata M.B.Bayer accepted as Haworthia rossouwii Poelln. var. rossouwii, endemic
 Haworthia setata Haw. accepted as Haworthia arachnoidea (L.) Duval var. setata (Haw.) M.B.Bayer, indigenous
 Haworthia setata Haw. var. bijliana (Poelln.) Poelln. subvar. joubertii, accepted as Haworthia mucronata Haw. var. inconfluens (Poelln.) M.B.Bayer, indigenous
 Haworthia setata Haw. var. gigas (Poelln.) Poelln. accepted as Haworthia arachnoidea (L.) Duval var. setata (Haw.) M.B.Bayer, indigenous
 Haworthia setata Haw. var. joubertii (Poelln.) H.Jacobsen, accepted as Haworthia mucronata Haw. var. inconfluens (Poelln.) M.B.Bayer, indigenous
 Haworthia setata Haw. var. major Haw. accepted as Haworthia arachnoidea (L.) Duval var. setata (Haw.) M.B.Bayer, indigenous
 Haworthia setata Haw. var. media Haw. accepted as Haworthia arachnoidea (L.) Duval var. setata (Haw.) M.B.Bayer, indigenous
 Haworthia setata Haw. var. nigricans Haw. accepted as Haworthia arachnoidea (L.) Duval var. nigricans (Haw.) M.B.Bayer, indigenous
 Haworthia setata Haw. var. subinermis Poelln. accepted as Haworthia aristata Haw. indigenous
 Haworthia setata Haw. var. xiphiophylla (Baker) Poelln. accepted as Haworthia decipiens Poelln. var. xiphiophylla (Baker) M.B.Bayer, indigenous
 Haworthia setulifera (Poelln.) Breuer, accepted as Haworthia cymbiformis (Haw.) Duval var. setulifera (Poelln.) M.B.Bayer, indigenous
 Haworthia shieldsiana Parr, accepted as Astroloba congesta (Salm-Dyck) Uitewaal
 Haworthia silviae M.Hayashi, accepted as Haworthia pygmaea Poelln. var. argenteomaculosa (G.G.Sm.) M.B.Bayer, indigenous
 Haworthia skinneri (A.Berger) Resende, accepted as × Astrolista bicarinata (Haw.) Molteno & Figueiredo, indigenous
 Haworthia smitii Poelln. accepted as Haworthiopsis scabra (Haw.) G.D.Rowley var. smitii (Poelln.) Gildenh. & Klopper, indigenous
 Haworthia solitaria (G.G.Sm.) C.L.Scott, accepted as Haworthia retusa (L.) Duval var. retusa, indigenous
 Haworthia sordida Haw. accepted as Haworthiopsis sordida (Haw.) G.D.Rowley, indigenous
 Haworthia sordida Haw. var. agavoides (Zantner & Poelln.) G.G.Sm. accepted as Haworthiopsis sordida (Haw.) G.D.Rowley var. sordida, indigenous
 Haworthia sordida Haw. var. lavranii C.L.Scott, accepted as Haworthiopsis sordida (Haw.) G.D.Rowley var. lavranii (C.L.Scott) G.D.Rowley, endemic
 Haworthia sparsa M.Hayashi, accepted as Tulista pumila (L.) G.D.Rowley, indigenous
 Haworthia specksii Breuer, accepted as Haworthia bolusii Baker var. blackbeardiana (Poelln.) M.B.Bayer, indigenous
 Haworthia splendens (S.A.Hammer & J.D.Venter) M.Hayashi, accepted as Haworthia mirabilis (Haw.) Haw. var. splendens (S.A.Hammer & J.D.Venter) M.B.Bayer, indigenous
 Haworthia springbokvlakensis C.L.Scott, endemic
 Haworthia standeri (Esterhuizen) M.Hayashi, accepted as Haworthia mucronata Haw. var. inconfluens (Poelln.) M.B.Bayer, indigenous
 Haworthia starkiana Poelln. accepted as Haworthiopsis scabra (Haw.) G.D.Rowley var. starkiana (Poelln.) G.D.Rowley, indigenous
 Haworthia starkiana Poelln. var. lateganiae (Poelln.) M.B.Bayer, accepted as Haworthiopsis scabra (Haw.) G.D.Rowley var. lateganiae (Poelln.) G.D.Rowley, indigenous
 Haworthia stayneri Poelln. accepted as Haworthia cooperi Baker var. pilifera (Baker) M.B.Bayer, indigenous
 Haworthia stayneri Poelln. var. salina Poelln. accepted as Haworthia cooperi Baker var. pilifera (Baker) M.B.Bayer, indigenous
 Haworthia stiemiei Poelln. accepted as Haworthia decipiens Poelln. var. xiphiophylla (Baker) M.B.Bayer
 Haworthia suberecta (Poelln.) Breuer, accepted as Haworthia retusa (L.) Duval var. suberecta (Poelln.) M.B.Bayer, indigenous
 Haworthia suberecta (Poelln.) Breuer var. pallidifolia (G.G.Sm.) Breuer, accepted as Haworthia retusa (L.) Duval var. suberecta (Poelln.) M.B.Bayer, indigenous
 Haworthia subfasciata (Salm-Dyck) Baker, accepted as Haworthiopsis fasciata (Willd.) G.D.Rowley var. fasciata, indigenous
 Haworthia subfasciata (Salm-Dyck) Baker var. kingiana Poelln. accepted as Tulista kingiana (Poelln.) Gideon F.Sm. & Molteno	indig; end
 Haworthia subglauca (Poelln.) M.Hayashi, accepted as Haworthia chloracantha Haw. var. subglauca Poelln. indigenous
 Haworthia subhamata M.Hayashi, accepted as Haworthia cooperi Baker var. viridis (M.B.Bayer) M.B.Bayer, indigenous
 Haworthia sublimpidula Poelln. accepted as Haworthia mirabilis (Haw.) Haw. var. maraisii (Poelln.) M.B.Baye, indigenous
 Haworthia sublineata (Poelln.) Breuer, accepted as Haworthia mirabilis (Haw.) Haw. var. sublineata (Poelln.) M.B.Bayer, indigenous
 Haworthia submaculata Poelln. accepted as Haworthia herbacea (Mill.) Stearn var. herbacea, indigenous
 Haworthia subregularis Baker, accepted as Haworthia reticulata (Haw.) Haw. var. subregularis (Baker) Pilbeam, indigenous
 Haworthia subulata (Salm-Dyck) Baker, accepted as Haworthiopsis attenuata (Haw.) G.D.Rowley var. attenuata, indigenous
 Haworthia succinea M.Hayashi, accepted as Haworthia decipiens Poelln. var. cyanea M.B.Bayer, indigenous
 Haworthia tarkasia M.Hayashi, accepted as Haworthia marumiana Uitewaal var. marumiana, indigenous
 Haworthia tenera Poelln. accepted as Haworthia cooperi Baker var. tenera (Poelln.) M.B.Bayer, indigenous
 Haworthia tenera Poelln. var. (Breuer & M.Hayashi) Breuer, accepted as Haworthia cooperi Baker var. tenera (Poelln.) M.B.Bayer, indigenous
 Haworthia tenera Poelln. var. doldii (M.B.Bayer) Breuer, accepted as Haworthia cooperi Baker var. doldii M.B.Bayer, indigenous
 Haworthia tenera Poelln. var. major (Poelln.) Uitewaal, accepted as Haworthia arachnoidea (L.) Duval var. setata (Haw.) M.B.Bayer, indigenous
 Haworthia tenuis (G.G.Sm.) Breuer, accepted as Haworthiopsis coarctata (Haw.) G.D.Rowley var. tenuis (G.G.Sm.) G.D.Rowley, indigenous
 Haworthia teres M.Hayashi, accepted as Haworthia cooperi Baker var. viridis (M.B.Bayer) M.B.Bayer, indigenous
 Haworthia tessellata Haw. accepted as Haworthiopsis tessellata (Haw.) G.D.Rowley, indigenous
 Haworthia tessellata Haw. var. coriacea Resende & Poelln. accepted as Haworthiopsis tessellata (Haw.) G.D.Rowley var. tessellata, indigenous
 Haworthia tessellata Haw. var. coriacea Resende & Poelln. forma brevior, accepted as Haworthiopsis tessellata (Haw.) G.D.Rowley var. tessellata, indigenous
 Haworthia tessellata Haw. var. coriacea Resende & Poelln. forma longior, accepted as Haworthiopsis tessellata (Haw.) G.D.Rowley var. tessellata, indigenous
 Haworthia tessellata Haw. var. elongata Woerden, accepted as Haworthiopsis tessellata (Haw.) G.D.Rowley var. tessellata, indigenous
 Haworthia tessellata Haw. var. engleri (Dinter) Poelln. accepted as Haworthiopsis tessellata (Haw.) G.D.Rowley var. tessellata, indigenous
 Haworthia tessellata Haw. var. inflexa Baker, accepted as Haworthiopsis tessellata (Haw.) G.D.Rowley var. tessellata, indigenous
 Haworthia tessellata Haw. var. luisieri Resende & Poelln. accepted as Haworthiopsis tessellata (Haw.) G.D.Rowley var. tessellata, indigenous
 Haworthia tessellata Haw. var. minutissima (Poelln.) Viveiros, accepted as Haworthiopsis tessellata (Haw.) G.D.Rowley var. tessellata, indigenous
 Haworthia tessellata Haw. var. obesa Resende & Poelln. accepted as Haworthiopsis tessellata (Haw.) G.D.Rowley var. tessellata, indigenous
 Haworthia tessellata Haw. var. palhinhae Resende & Poelln. accepted as Haworthiopsis tessellata (Haw.) G.D.Rowley var. tessellata, indigenous
 Haworthia tessellata Haw. var. parva (Schult. & J.H.Schult.) Baker, accepted as Haworthiopsis tessellata (Haw.) G.D.Rowley var. tessellata, indigenous
 Haworthia tessellata Haw. var. simplex Resende & Poelln. accepted as Haworthiopsis tessellata (Haw.) G.D.Rowley var. tessellata, indigenous
 Haworthia tessellata Haw. var. stephaniana Resende & Poelln. accepted as Haworthiopsis tessellata (Haw.) G.D.Rowley var. tessellata, indigenous
 Haworthia tessellata Haw. var. tuberculata Poelln. accepted as Haworthiopsis tessellata (Haw.) G.D.Rowley var. tessellata, indigenous
 Haworthia tessellata Haw. var. velutina Resende & Poelln., accepted as Haworthiopsis tessellata (Haw.) G.D.Rowley var. tessellata, indigenous
 Haworthia tisleyi Baker, accepted as Haworthia attenuata (Haw.) Haw. var. attenuata
 Haworthia toonensis (M.B.Bayer) Breuer, accepted as Haworthia mirabilis (Haw.) Haw. var. toonensis (M.B.Bayer) M.B.Bayer, indigenous
 Haworthia torquata Haw. accepted as Haworthiopsis viscosa (L.) Gildenh. & Klopper var. viscosa, indigenous
 Haworthia tortuosa (Haw.) Haw. accepted as Haworthia viscosa (L.) Haw. var. viscosa
 Haworthia tradouwensis Breuer, accepted as Haworthia mucronata Haw. var. mucronata, endemic
 Haworthia transiens (Poelln.) M.B.Bayer, accepted as Haworthia transiens (Poelln.) M.Hayashi, endemic
 Haworthia transiens (Poelln.) M.Hayashi, endemic
 Haworthia transiens (Poelln.) M.Hayashi var. florens (M.Hayashi) Breuer, accepted as Haworthia cooperi Baker var. isabellae (Poelln.) M.B.Bayer, indigenous
 Haworthia translucens (Haw.) Haw. accepted as Haworthia herbacea (Mill.) Stearn var. herbacea, indigenous
 Haworthia translucens (Haw.) Haw. subsp. tenera (Poelln.) M.B.Bayer, accepted as Haworthia cooperi Baker var. tenera (Poelln.) M.B.Bayer, indigenous
 Haworthia tretyrensis Breuer, accepted as Haworthia arachnoidea (L.) Duval var. setata (Haw.) M.B.Bayer, endemic
 Haworthia tretyrensis Breuer var. pectinis (M.Hayashi) Breuer, accepted as Haworthia arachnoidea (L.) Duval var. setata (Haw.) M.B.Bayer, indigenous
 Haworthia tricolor (Breuer) M.Hayashi, accepted as Haworthia emelyae Poelln. var. emelyae, indigenous
 Haworthia triebneriana Poelln. accepted as Haworthia mirabilis (Haw.) Haw. var. triebneriana (Poelln.) M.B.Bayer, indigenous
 Haworthia triebneriana Poelln. var. depauperata Poelln. accepted as Haworthia mirabilis (Haw.) Haw. var. triebneriana (Poelln.) M.B.Bayer, indigenous
 Haworthia triebneriana Poelln. var. diversicolor Triebner & Poelln. accepted as Haworthia mirabilis (Haw.) Haw. var. triebneriana (Poelln.) M.B.Bayer, indigenous
 Haworthia triebneriana Poelln. var. multituberculata Poelln. accepted as Haworthia mirabilis (Haw.) Haw. var. triebneriana (Poelln.) M.B.Bayer, indigenous
 Haworthia triebneriana Poelln. var. napierensis Triebner & Poelln. accepted as Haworthia mirabilis (Haw.) Haw. var. triebneriana (Poelln.) M.B.Bayer, indigenous
 Haworthia triebneriana Poelln. var. pulchra Poelln. accepted as Haworthia mirabilis (Haw.) Haw. var. triebneriana (Poelln.) M.B.Bayer, indigenous
 Haworthia triebneriana Poelln. var. rubrodentata Triebner & Poelln. accepted as Haworthia mirabilis (Haw.) Haw. var. triebneriana (Poelln.) M.B.Bayer, indigenous
 Haworthia triebneriana Poelln. var. sublineata Poelln. accepted as Haworthia mirabilis (Haw.) Haw. var. sublineata (Poelln.) M.B.Bayer, indigenous
 Haworthia triebneriana Poelln. var. subtuberculata Poelln. accepted as Haworthia mirabilis (Haw.) Haw. var. triebneriana (Poelln.) M.B.Bayer, indigenous
 Haworthia triebneriana Poelln. var. turgida Triebner, accepted as Haworthia mirabilis (Haw.) Haw. var. triebneriana (Poelln.) M.B.Bayer, indigenous
 Haworthia truncata Schonland, endemic
 Haworthia truncata Schonland forma crassa Poelln. accepted as Haworthia truncata Schonland var. truncata, indigenous
 Haworthia truncata Schonland forma normalis Poelln. accepted as Haworthia truncata Schonland var. truncata, indigenous
 Haworthia truncata Schonland forma tenuis Poelln. accepted as Haworthia truncata Schonland var. truncata, indigenous
 Haworthia truncata Schonland var. maughanii (Poelln.) B.Fearn, endemic
 Haworthia truncata Schonland var. minor Breuer, accepted as Haworthia truncata Schonland var. truncata, endemic
 Haworthia truncata Schonland var. tenuis (Poelln.) M.B.Bayer, accepted as Haworthia truncata Schonland var. truncata, indigenous
 Haworthia truncata Schonland var. truncata, endemic
 Haworthia truterorum Breuer & Marx, accepted as Haworthia bayeri J.D.Venter & S.A.Hammer, indigenous
 Haworthia tuberculata Poelln. accepted as Haworthiopsis scabra (Haw.) G.D.Rowley var. scabra, indigenous
 Haworthia tuberculata Poelln. var. acuminata Poelln. accepted as Haworthiopsis scabra (Haw.) G.D.Rowley var. scabra, indigenous
 Haworthia tuberculata Poelln. var. angustata Poelln. accepted as Haworthiopsis scabra (Haw.) G.D.Rowley var. scabra, indigenous
 Haworthia tuberculata Poelln. var. subexpansa Poelln. accepted as Haworthiopsis scabra (Haw.) G.D.Rowley var. scabra, indigenous
 Haworthia tuberculata Poelln. var. sublaevis Poelln. accepted as Haworthiopsis scabra (Haw.) G.D.Rowley var. scabra, indigenous
 Haworthia turgida Haw. accepted as Haworthia retusa (L.) Duval var. turgida (Haw.) M.B.Bayer, indigenous
 Haworthia turgida Haw. forma suberecta (Poelln.) Pilbeam, accepted as Haworthia retusa (L.) Duval var. suberecta (Poelln.) M.B.Bayer, indigenous
 Haworthia turgida Haw. var. longibracteata (G.G.Sm.) M.B.Bayer, accepted as Haworthia retusa (L.) Duval var. longibracteata (G.G.Sm.) M.B.Bayer, endemic
 Haworthia turgida Haw. var. pallidifolia G.G.Sm. accepted as Haworthia retusa (L.) Duval var. suberecta (Poelln.) M.B.Bayer, indigenous
 Haworthia turgida Haw. var. suberecta Poelln. accepted as Haworthia retusa (L.) Duval var. suberecta (Poelln.) M.B.Bayer, endemic
 Haworthia turgida Haw. var. subtuberculata Poelln. accepted as Haworthia retusa (L.) Duval var. suberecta (Poelln.) M.B.Bayer, indigenous
 Haworthia uitewaaliana Poelln. accepted as Tulista minor (Aiton) Gideon F.Sm. & Molteno, indigenous
 Haworthia umbraticola Poelln. accepted as Haworthia cymbiformis (Haw.) Duval var. obtusa (Haw.) Baker, indigenous
 Haworthia umbraticola Poelln. var. hilliana (Poelln.) Poelln. accepted as Haworthia cymbiformis (Haw.) Duval var. obtusa (Haw.) Baker, indigenous
 Haworthia umbraticola Poelln. var. obesa (Poelln.) Breuer, accepted as Haworthia cymbiformis (Haw.) Duval var. setulifera (Poelln.) M.B.Bayer, indigenous
 Haworthia unicolor Poelln. accepted as Haworthia mucronata Haw. var. mucronata, indigenous
 Haworthia unicolor Poelln. var. helmiae (Poelln.) M.B.Bayer, accepted as Haworthia arachnoidea (L.) Duval var. nigricans (Haw.) M.B.Bayer
 Haworthia unicolor Poelln. var. venteri (Poelln.) M.B.Bayer, accepted as Haworthia arachnoidea (L.) Duval var. nigricans (Haw.) M.B.Bayer, indigenous
 Haworthia variabilis (Breuer) Breuer, accepted as Haworthiopsis viscosa (L.) Gildenh. & Klopper var. variabilis (Breuer) Gildenh. & Klopper, indigenous
 Haworthia variegata L.Bolus, endemic
 Haworthia variegata L.Bolus var. hemicrypta M.B.Bayer, endemic
 Haworthia variegata L.Bolus var. modesta M.B.Bayer, endemic
 Haworthia variegata L.Bolus var. petrophila M.B.Bayer, accepted as Haworthia rossouwii Poelln. var. minor (M.B.Bayer) M.B.Bayer, endemic
 Haworthia variegata L.Bolus var. variegata, endemic
 Haworthia venetia M.Hayashi, accepted as Haworthia cooperi Baker var. gordoniana (Poelln.) M.B.Bayer, indigenous
 Haworthia venetia M.Hayashi var. calva (M.Hayashi) Breuer, accepted as Haworthia cooperi Baker, indigenous
 Haworthia venetia M.Hayashi var. jeffreis (M.Hayashi) Breuer, accepted as Haworthia cooperi Baker var. gordoniana (Poelln.) M.B.Bayer, indigenous
 Haworthia venetia M.Hayashi var. teres (M.Hayashi) Breuer, accepted as Haworthia cooperi Baker var. viridis (M.B.Bayer) M.B.Bayer, indigenous
 Haworthia venosa (Lam.) Haw. accepted as Haworthiopsis venosa (Lam.) G.D.Rowley, indigenous
 Haworthia venosa (Lam.) Haw. subsp. granulata (Marloth) M.B.Bayer, accepted as Haworthiopsis granulata (Marloth) G.D.Rowley, endemic
 Haworthia venosa (Lam.) Haw. subsp. nigra (Haw.) Halda, accepted as Haworthiopsis nigra (Haw.) G.D.Rowley, indigenous
 Haworthia venosa (Lam.) Haw. subsp. recurva (Haw.) M.B.Bayer, accepted as Haworthiopsis venosa (Lam.) G.D.Rowley, indigenous
 Haworthia venosa (Lam.) Haw. subsp. tessellata (Haw.) M.B.Bayer, accepted as Haworthiopsis tessellata (Haw.) G.D.Rowley, indigenous
 Haworthia venosa (Lam.) Haw. subsp. woolleyi (Poelln.) Halda, accepted as Haworthiopsis woolleyi (Poelln.) G.D.Rowley, endemic
 Haworthia venosa (Lam.) Haw. subsp. woolleyi (Poelln.) M.B.Bayer, accepted as Haworthiopsis woolleyi (Poelln.) G.D.Rowley, indigenous
 Haworthia venosa (Lam.) Haw. var. oertendahlii Hjelmq. accepted as Haworthiopsis venosa (Lam.) G.D.Rowley, indigenous
 Haworthia venosa (Lam.) Haw. var. tessellata (Haw.) Halda, accepted as Haworthiopsis tessellata (Haw.) G.D.Rowley, indigenous
 Haworthia venteri Poelln. accepted as Haworthia arachnoidea (L.) Duval var. nigricans (Haw.) M.B.Bayer, indigenous
 Haworthia venusta C.L.Scott, accepted as Haworthia cooperi Baker var. venusta (C.L.Scott) M.B.Bayer, indigenous
 Haworthia vincentii Breuer, accepted as Haworthia pygmaea Poelln. var. vincentii (Breuer) M.B.Bayer, indigenous
 Haworthia virella (M.B.Bayer) M.Hayashi, accepted as Haworthia decipiens Poelln. var. virella M.B.Bayer, endemic
 Haworthia virescens Haw. accepted as Tulista marginata (Lam.) G.D.Rowley, indigenous
 Haworthia virescens Haw. var. minor Haw. accepted as Tulista marginata (Lam.) G.D.Rowley, indigenous
 Haworthia viscosa (L.) Haw. accepted as Haworthiopsis viscosa (L.) Gildenh. & Klopper, indigenous
 Haworthia viscosa (L.) Haw. forma asperiuscula (Haw.) Pilbeam, accepted as Haworthiopsis viscosa (L.) Gildenh. & Klopper var. viscosa, indigenous
 Haworthia viscosa (L.) Haw. forma beanii (G.G.Sm.) Pilbeam, accepted as Haworthiopsis viscosa (L.) Gildenh. & Klopper var. viscosa, indigenous
 Haworthia viscosa (L.) Haw. forma pseudotortuosa (Haw.) Pilbeam. accepted as Haworthiopsis viscosa (L.) Gildenh. & Klopper var. viscosa, indigenous
 Haworthia viscosa (L.) Haw. forma subobtusa (Poelln.) Pilbeam, accepted as Haworthiopsis very iscosa (L.) Gildenh. & Klopper var. viscosa, indigenous
 Haworthia viscosa (L.) Haw. forma torquata (Haw.) Pilbeam, accepted as Haworthiopsis viscosa (L.) Gildenh. & Klopper var. viscosa, indigenous
 Haworthia viscosa (L.) Haw. subsp. derekii-clarkii Halda, accepted as Haworthiopsis viscosa (L.) Gildenh. & Klopper var. viscosa, indigenous
 Haworthia viscosa (L.) Haw. subsp. nigra (Haw.) Halda, accepted as Haworthiopsis nigra (Haw.) G.D.Rowley, indigenous
 Haworthia viscosa (L.) Haw. var. caespitosa Poelln. accepted as Haworthiopsis viscosa (L.) Gildenh. & Klopper var. viscosa, indigenous
 Haworthia viscosa (L.) Haw. var. concinna (Schult. & J.H.Schult.) Baker, accepted as Haworthiopsis viscosa (L.) Gildenh. & Klopper var. viscosa, indigenous
 Haworthia viscosa (L.) Haw. var. cougaensis G.G.Sm., accepted as Haworthiopsis viscosa (L.) Gildenh. & Klopper var. viscosa, indigenous
 Haworthia viscosa (L.) Haw. var. indurata (Haw.) Baker, accepted as Haworthiopsis viscosa (L.) Gildenh. & Klopper var. viscosa, indigenous
 Haworthia viscosa (L.) Haw. var. major Haw. accepted as Haworthiopsis viscosa (L.) Gildenh. & Klopper var. viscosa, indigenous
 Haworthia viscosa (L.) Haw. var. minor Haw. accepted as Haworthiopsis viscosa (L.) Gildenh. & Klopper var. viscosa, indigenous
 Haworthia viscosa (L.) Haw. var. parvifolia Haw. accepted as Haworthiopsis viscosa (L.) Gildenh. & Klopper var. viscosa, indigenous
 Haworthia viscosa (L.) Haw. var. pseudotortuosa (Salm-Dyck) Baker, accepted as Haworthiopsis viscosa (L.) Gildenh. & Klopper var. viscosa, indigenous
 Haworthia viscosa (L.) Haw. var. quaggaensis G.G.Sm. accepted as Haworthiopsis viscosa (L.) Gildenh. & Klopper var. viscosa, indigenous
 Haworthia viscosa (L.) Haw. var. subobtusa Poelln. accepted as Haworthiopsis viscosa (L.) Gildenh. & Klopper var. viscosa, indigenous
 Haworthia viscosa (L.) Haw. var. torquata (Salm-Dyck) Baker, accepted as Haworthiopsis viscosa (L.) Gildenh. & Klopper var. viscosa, indigenous
 Haworthia viscosa (L.) Haw. var. variabilis Breuer, accepted as Haworthiopsis viscosa (L.) Gildenh. & Klopper var. variabilis (Breuer) Gildenh. & Klopper, endemic
 Haworthia viscosa (L.) Haw. var. viridissima G.G.Sm. accepted as Haworthiopsis viscosa (L.) Gildenh. & Klopper var. viscosa, indigenous
 Haworthia vittata Baker, accepted as Haworthia cooperi Baker var. cooperi, indigenous
 Haworthia vlokii M.B.Bayer, endemic
 Haworthia whitesloaneana Poelln. accepted as Haworthia mirabilis (Haw.) Haw. var. maraisii (Poelln.) M.B.Bayer, indigenous
 Haworthia willowmorensis Poelln. accepted as Haworthia mirabilis (Haw.) Haw. var. triebneriana (Poelln.) M.B.Bayer, indigenous
 Haworthia wimii M.Hayashi, accepted as Haworthia emelyae Poelln. var. major (G.G.Sm.) M.B.Bayer, indigenous
 Haworthia wittebergensis W.F.Barker, endemic
 Haworthia woolleyi Poelln. accepted as Haworthiopsis woolleyi (Poelln.) G.D.Rowley, indigenous
 Haworthia xiphiophylla Baker, accepted as Haworthia decipiens Poelln. var. xiphiophylla (Baker) M.B.Bayer, indigenous
 Haworthia zantneriana Poelln. endemic
 Haworthia zantneriana Poelln. var. minor M.B.Bayer, endemic
 Haworthia zantneriana Poelln. var. zantneriana, endemic
 Haworthia zenigata M.Hayashi, accepted as Tulista minor (Aiton) Gideon F.Sm. & Molteno, endemic

Haworthiopsis 
Genus Haworthiopsis:
 Haworthiopsis attenuata (Haw.) Breuer, accepted as Haworthiopsis attenuata (Haw.) G.D.Rowley, endemic
 Haworthiopsis attenuata (Haw.) G.D.Rowley, endemic
 Haworthiopsis attenuata (Haw.) G.D.Rowley var. attenuata, endemic
 Haworthiopsis attenuata (Haw.) G.D.Rowley var. glabrata (Salm-Dyck) G.D.Rowley, endemic
 Haworthiopsis attenuata (Haw.) G.D.Rowley var. radula (Jacq.) G.D.Rowley, endemic
 Haworthiopsis attenuata Haw. var. glabrata (Salm-Dyck) Breuer, accepted as Haworthiopsis attenuata (Haw.) G.D.Rowley var. glabrata (Salm-Dyck) G.D.Rowley, indigenous
 Haworthiopsis attenuata Haw. var. radula (Jacq.) Breuer, accepted as Haworthiopsis attenuata (Haw.) G.D.Rowley var. radula (Jacq.) G.D.Rowley, indigenous
 Haworthiopsis bruynsii (M.B.Bayer) G.D.Rowley, endemic
 Haworthiopsis coarctata (Haw.) G.D.Rowley, endemic
 Haworthiopsis coarctata (Haw.) G.D.Rowley var. adelaidensis (Poelln.) G.D.Rowley, endemic
 Haworthiopsis coarctata (Haw.) G.D.Rowley var. coarctata, endemic
 Haworthiopsis coarctata (Haw.) G.D.Rowley var. tenuis (G.G.Sm.) G.D.Rowley, endemic
 Haworthiopsis fasciata (Willd.) G.D.Rowley, endemic
 Haworthiopsis fasciata (Willd.) G.D.Rowley var. browniana (Poelln.) Breuer, accepted as Haworthiopsis fasciata (Willd.) G.D.Rowley var. browniana (Poelln.) Gildenh. & Klopper, indigenous
 Haworthiopsis fasciata (Willd.) G.D.Rowley var. browniana (Poelln.) Gildenh. & Klopper, endemic
 Haworthiopsis fasciata (Willd.) G.D.Rowley var. fasciata, endemic
 Haworthiopsis glauca (Baker) G.D.Rowley, endemic
 Haworthiopsis glauca (Baker) G.D.Rowley var. glauca, endemic
 Haworthiopsis glauca (Baker) G.D.Rowley var. herrei (Poelln.) G.D.Rowley, endemic
 Haworthiopsis granulata (Marloth) G.D.Rowley, endemic
 Haworthiopsis granulata (Marloth) G.D.Rowley var. schoemanii (M.Hayashi) Breuer, accepted as Haworthiopsis granulata (Marloth) G.D.Rowley, indigenous
 Haworthiopsis koelmaniorum (Oberm. & D.S.Hardy) Boatwr. & J.C.Manning, endemic
 Haworthiopsis koelmaniorum (Oberm. & D.S.Hardy) Boatwr. & J.C.Manning var. koelmaniorum, endemic
 Haworthiopsis koelmaniorum (Oberm. & D.S.Hardy) Boatwr. & J.C.Manning var. mcmurtryi (C.L.Scott) Breuer, accepted as Haworthiopsis koelmaniorum (Oberm. & D.S.Hardy) Boatwr. & J.C.Manning var. mcmurtryi (C.L.Scott) Gil, indigenous
 Haworthiopsis koelmaniorum (Oberm. & D.S.Hardy) Boatwr. & J.C.Manning var. mcmurtryi (C.L.Scott) Gil, endemic
 Haworthiopsis limifolia (Marloth) G.D.Rowley, indigenous
 Haworthiopsis limifolia (Marloth) G.D.Rowley var. arcana (Gideon F.Sm. & N.R.Crouch) G.D.Rowley, endemic
 Haworthiopsis limifolia (Marloth) G.D.Rowley var. gigantea (M.B.Bayer) G.D.Rowley, endemic
 Haworthiopsis limifolia (Marloth) G.D.Rowley var. glaucophylla (M.B.Bayer) Breuer, endemic
 Haworthiopsis limifolia (Marloth) G.D.Rowley var. glaucophylla (M.B.Bayer) G.D.Rowley, accepted as Haworthiopsis limifolia (Marloth) G.D.Rowley var. glaucophylla (M.B.Bayer) Breuer, indigenous
 Haworthiopsis limifolia (Marloth) G.D.Rowley var. limifolia, indigenous
 Haworthiopsis limifolia (Marloth) G.D.Rowley var. striata (M.B.Bayer) Breuer, accepted as Haworthiopsis limifolia (Marloth) G.D.Rowley var. limifolia, indigenous
 Haworthiopsis longiana (Poelln.) G.D.Rowley, endemic
 Haworthiopsis mcmurtryi (C.L.Scott) Zonn. accepted as Haworthiopsis koelmaniorum (Oberm. & D.S.Hardy) Boatwr. & J.C.Manning var. mcmurtryi (C.L.Scott) Gil, indigenous
 Haworthiopsis nigra (Haw.) G.D.Rowley, endemic
 Haworthiopsis nigra (Haw.) G.D.Rowley var. diversifolia (Poelln.) G.D.Rowley, endemic
 Haworthiopsis nigra (Haw.) G.D.Rowley var. elongata (Poelln.) G.D.Rowley, endemic
 Haworthiopsis nigra (Haw.) G.D.Rowley var. nigra, endemic
 Haworthiopsis pungens (M.B.Bayer) Boatwr. & J.C.Manning, endemic
 Haworthiopsis reinwardtii (Salm-Dyck) G.D.Rowley, endemic
 Haworthiopsis reinwardtii (Salm-Dyck) G.D.Rowley var. brevicula (G.G.Sm.) G.D.Rowley, endemic
 Haworthiopsis reinwardtii (Salm-Dyck) G.D.Rowley var. coarctata (Haw.) Breuer, accepted as Haworthiopsis coarctata (Haw.) G.D.Rowley, indigenous
 Haworthiopsis reinwardtii (Salm-Dyck) G.D.Rowley var. olivacea (G.G.Sm.) Breuer, accepted as Haworthiopsis reinwardtii (Salm-Dyck) G.D.Rowley var. reinwardtii forma olivacea, indigenous
 Haworthiopsis reinwardtii (Salm-Dyck) G.D.Rowley var. reinwardtii forma chalumnensis, endemic
 Haworthiopsis reinwardtii (Salm-Dyck) G.D.Rowley var. reinwardtii forma kaffirdriftensis, endemic
 Haworthiopsis reinwardtii (Salm-Dyck) G.D.Rowley var. reinwardtii forma olivacea, endemic
 Haworthiopsis reinwardtii (Salm-Dyck) G.D.Rowley var. reinwardtii forma reinwardtii, endemic
 Haworthiopsis reinwardtii (Salm-Dyck) G.D.Rowley var. tenuis (G.G.Sm.) Breuer, accepted as Haworthiopsis coarctata (Haw.) G.D.Rowley var. tenuis (G.G.Sm.) G.D.Rowley, indigenous
 Haworthiopsis scabra (Haw.) G.D.Rowley, endemic
 Haworthiopsis scabra (Haw.) G.D.Rowley var. johanii (M.Hayashi) Breuer, accepted as Haworthiopsis scabra (Haw.) G.D.Rowley var. scabra, indigenous
 Haworthiopsis scabra (Haw.) G.D.Rowley var. lateganiae (Poelln.) G.D.Rowley, endemic
 Haworthiopsis scabra (Haw.) G.D.Rowley var. morrisiae (Poelln.) G.D.Rowley, endemic
 Haworthiopsis scabra (Haw.) G.D.Rowley var. scabra, endemic
 Haworthiopsis scabra (Haw.) G.D.Rowley var. smitii (Poelln.) Breuer, accepted as Haworthiopsis scabra (Haw.) G.D.Rowley var. smitii (Poelln.) Gildenh. & Klopper, indigenous
 Haworthiopsis scabra (Haw.) G.D.Rowley var. smitii (Poelln.) Gildenh. & Klopper, endemic
 Haworthiopsis scabra (Haw.) G.D.Rowley var. starkiana (Poelln.) G.D.Rowley, endemic
 Haworthiopsis sordida (Haw.) G.D.Rowley, endemic
 Haworthiopsis sordida (Haw.) G.D.Rowley var. agavoides (Zantner & Poelln.) Breuer, accepted as Haworthiopsis sordida (Haw.) G.D.Rowley var. sordida, indigenous
 Haworthiopsis sordida (Haw.) G.D.Rowley var. lavranii (C.L.Scott) G.D.Rowley, endemic
 Haworthiopsis sordida (Haw.) G.D.Rowley var. sordida, endemic
 Haworthiopsis tessellata (Haw.) Boatwr. & J.C.Manning, accepted as Haworthiopsis tessellata (Haw.) G.D.Rowley, indigenous
 Haworthiopsis tessellata (Haw.) G.D.Rowley, indigenous
 Haworthiopsis tessellata (Haw.) G.D.Rowley var. crousii (M.Hayashi) Breuer, accepted as Haworthiopsis tessellata (Haw.) G.D.Rowley var. crousii (M.Hayashi) Gildenh. & Klopper, indigenous
 Haworthiopsis tessellata (Haw.) G.D.Rowley var. crousii (M.Hayashi) Gildenh. & Klopper, endemic
 Haworthiopsis tessellata (Haw.) G.D.Rowley var. tessellata, indigenous
 Haworthiopsis variabilis (Breuer) Zonn. accepted as Haworthiopsis viscosa (L.) Gildenh. & Klopper var. variabilis (Breuer) Gildenh. & Klopper, indigenous
 Haworthiopsis venosa (Lam.) G.D.Rowley, endemic
 Haworthiopsis venosa (Lam.) G.D.Rowley var. granulata (Marloth) G.D.Rowley, accepted as Haworthiopsis granulata (Marloth) G.D.Rowley, indigenous
 Haworthiopsis venosa (Lam.) G.D.Rowley var. woolleyi (Poelln.) Breuer, accepted as Haworthiopsis woolleyi (Poelln.) G.D.Rowley	indig
 Haworthiopsis viscosa (L.) Breuer, accepted as Haworthiopsis viscosa (L.) Gildenh. & Klopper, indigenous
 Haworthiopsis viscosa (L.) G.D.Rowley, accepted as Haworthiopsis viscosa (L.) Gildenh. & Klopper, indigenous
 Haworthiopsis viscosa (L.) Gildenh. & Klopper, endemic
 Haworthiopsis viscosa (L.) Gildenh. & Klopper var. asperiuscula (Haw.) Breuer, accepted as Haworthiopsis viscosa (L.) Gildenh. & Klopper var. viscosa, indigenous
 Haworthiopsis viscosa (L.) Gildenh. & Klopper var. beanii (G.G.Sm.) Breuer, accepted as Haworthiopsis viscosa (L.) Gildenh. & Klopper var. viscosa, indigenous
 Haworthiopsis viscosa (L.) Gildenh. & Klopper var. variabilis (Breuer) Gildenh. & Klopper, endemic
 Haworthiopsis viscosa (L.) Gildenh. & Klopper var. viscosa, endemic
 Haworthiopsis woolleyi (Poelln.) G.D.Rowley, endemic

Kniphofia 
Genus Kniphofia:
 Kniphofia acraea Codd, endemic
 Kniphofia albescens Codd, endemic
 Kniphofia albomontana Baijnath, indigenous
 Kniphofia angustifolia (Baker) Codd, endemic
 Kniphofia baurii Baker, endemic
 Kniphofia brachystachya (Zahlbr.) Codd, indigenous
 Kniphofia breviflora Harv. ex Baker, endemic
 Kniphofia bruceae (Codd) Codd, endemic
 Kniphofia buchananii Baker, endemic
 Kniphofia caulescens Baker, indigenous
 Kniphofia citrina Baker, endemic
 Kniphofia coddiana Cufod. endemic
 Kniphofia coralligemma E.A.Bruce, endemic
 Kniphofia crassifolia Baker, endemic
 Kniphofia drepanophylla Baker, endemic
 Kniphofia ensifolia Baker, indigenous
 Kniphofia ensifolia Baker subsp. autumnalis Codd, endemic
 Kniphofia ensifolia Baker subsp. ensifolia, indigenous
 Kniphofia evansii Baker, endemic
 Kniphofia fibrosa Baker, endemic
 Kniphofia flammula Codd, endemic
 Kniphofia fluviatilis Codd, endemic
 Kniphofia galpinii Baker, indigenous
 Kniphofia gracilis Harv. ex Baker, endemic
 Kniphofia hirsuta Codd, indigenous
 Kniphofia ichopensis Schinz, indigenous
 Kniphofia ichopensis Schinz var. aciformis Codd, endemic
 Kniphofia ichopensis Schinz var. ichopensis, endemic
 Kniphofia latifolia Codd, endemic
 Kniphofia laxiflora Kunth, endemic
 Kniphofia leucocephala Baijnath, endemic
 Kniphofia linearifolia Baker, indigenous
 Kniphofia littoralis Codd, endemic
 Kniphofia multiflora J.M.Wood & M.S.Evans, indigenous
 Kniphofia northiae Baker, indigenous
 Kniphofia parviflora Kunth, endemic
 Kniphofia pauciflora Baker, endemic
 Kniphofia porphyrantha Baker, indigenous
 Kniphofia praecox Baker, indigenous
 Kniphofia rigidifolia E.A.Bruce, endemic
 Kniphofia ritualis Codd, indigenous
 Kniphofia rooperi (T.Moore) Lem. endemic
 Kniphofia sarmentosa (Andrews) Kunth, endemic
 Kniphofia splendida E.A.Bruce, indigenous
 Kniphofia stricta Codd, indigenous
 Kniphofia tabularis Marloth, endemic
 Kniphofia thodei Baker, indigenous
 Kniphofia triangularis Kunth, indigenous
 Kniphofia triangularis Kunth subsp. obtusiloba (A.Berger) Codd, endemic
 Kniphofia triangularis Kunth subsp. triangularis, indigenous
 Kniphofia typhoides Codd, endemic
 Kniphofia tysonii Baker, indigenous
 Kniphofia tysonii Baker subsp. lebomboensis Codd, indigenous
 Kniphofia tysonii Baker subsp. tysonii, endemic
 Kniphofia uvaria (L.) Oken, endemic

Kumara 
Genus Kumara:
 Kumara haemanthifolia (A.Berger & Marloth) Boatwr. & J.C.Manning, endemic
 Kumara plicatilis (L.) G.D.Rowley, endemic
 Kumara plicatilis (L.) Klopper & Gideon F.Sm. accepted as Kumara plicatilis (L.) G.D.Rowley

Leptaloe 
Genus Leptaloe:
 Leptaloe albida Stapf, accepted as Aloe albida (Stapf) Reynolds
 Leptaloe myriacantha (Haw.) Stapf, accepted as Aloe myriacantha (Haw.) Schult. & J.H.Schult.	
 Leptaloe saundersiae Reynolds, accepted as Aloe saundersiae (Reynolds) Reynolds

Poellnitzia 
Genus Poellnitzia:
 Poellnitzia rubriflora (L.Bolus) Uitewaal, accepted as Astroloba rubriflora (L.Bolus) Gideon F.Sm. & J.C.Manning, indigenous
 Poellnitzia rubriflora (L.Bolus) Uitewaal var. jacobseniana (Poelln.) Uitewaal, accepted as Astroloba rubriflora (L.Bolus) Gideon F.Sm. & J.C.Manning, indigenous

Trachyandra 
Genus Trachyandra:
 Trachyandra acocksii Oberm. endemic
 Trachyandra adamsonii (Compton) Oberm. indigemous
 Trachyandra affinis Kunth, endemic
 Trachyandra arenicola J.C.Manning & Goldblatt, endemic
 Trachyandra aridimontana J.C.Manning, endemic
 Trachyandra asperata Kunth, indigemous
 Trachyandra asperata Kunth var. asperata, indigemous
 Trachyandra asperata Kunth var. basutoensis (Poelln.) Oberm. indigemous
 Trachyandra asperata Kunth var. carolinensis Oberm. endemic
 Trachyandra asperata Kunth var. macowanii (Baker) Oberm. indigemous
 Trachyandra asperata Kunth var. nataglencoensis (Kuntze) Oberm. indigemous
 Trachyandra asperata Kunth var. stenophylla (Baker) Oberm. endemic
 Trachyandra asperata Kunth var. swaziensis Oberm. indigemous
 Trachyandra brachypoda (Baker) Oberm. endemic
 Trachyandra bulbinifolia (Dinter) Oberm. indigemous
 Trachyandra burkei (Baker) Oberm. indigemous
 Trachyandra capillata (Poelln.) Oberm. endemic
 Trachyandra chlamydophylla (Baker) Oberm. endemic
 Trachyandra ciliata (L.f.) Kunth, indigemous
 Trachyandra dissecta Oberm. endemic
 Trachyandra divaricata (Jacq.) Kunth, endemic
 Trachyandra eriocarpa Boatwr. & J.C.Manning endemic
 Trachyandra erythrorrhiza (Conrath) Oberm. endemic
 Trachyandra esterhuysenae Oberm. endemic
 Trachyandra falcata (L.f.) Kunth, indigemous
 Trachyandra filiformis (Aiton) Oberm. endemic
 Trachyandra flexifolia (L.f.) Kunth, endemic
 Trachyandra gerrardii (Baker) Oberm. indigemous
 Trachyandra giffenii (F.M.Leight.) Oberm. endemic
 Trachyandra gracilenta Oberm. endemic
 Trachyandra hantamensis Boatwr. & J.C.Manning, endemic
 Trachyandra hirsuta (Thunb.) Kunth, endemic
 Trachyandra hirsutiflora (Adamson) Oberm. endemic
 Trachyandra hispida (L.) Kunth, endemic
 Trachyandra involucrata (Baker) Oberm. endemic
 Trachyandra jacquiniana (Roem. & Schult.) Oberm. endemic
 Trachyandra kamiesbergensis Boatwr. & J.C.Manning, endemic
 Trachyandra karrooica Oberm. indigemous
 Trachyandra laxa (N.E.Br.) Oberm. indigemous
 Trachyandra laxa (N.E.Br.) Oberm. var. laxa, indigemous
 Trachyandra laxa (N.E.Br.) Oberm. var. rigida (Suess.) Roessler, indigemous
 Trachyandra margaretae Oberm. endemic
 Trachyandra montana J.C.Manning & Goldblatt, endemic
 Trachyandra muricata (L.f.) Kunth, indigemous
 Trachyandra oligotricha (Baker) Oberm. endemic
 Trachyandra paniculata Oberm. endemic
 Trachyandra patens Oberm. endemic
 Trachyandra prolifera P.L.Perry, endemic
 Trachyandra reflexipilosa (Kuntze) Oberm. indigemous
 Trachyandra revoluta (L.) Kunth, indigemous
 Trachyandra sabulosa (Adamson) Oberm. endemic
 Trachyandra saltii (Baker) Oberm. indigemous
 Trachyandra saltii (Baker) Oberm. var. oatesii (Baker) Oberm. endemic
 Trachyandra saltii (Baker) Oberm. var. saltii, indigemous
 Trachyandra saltii (Baker) Oberm. var. secunda (K.Krause & Dinter) Oberm. indigemous
 Trachyandra sanguinorhiza Boatwr. & J.C.Manning, endemic
 Trachyandra scabra (L.f.) Kunth, endemic
 Trachyandra smalliana Hilliard & B.L.Burtt, endemic
 Trachyandra tabularis (Baker) Oberm. endemic
 Trachyandra thyrsoidea (Baker) Oberm. endemic
 Trachyandra tortilis (Baker) Oberm. endemic
 Trachyandra zebrina (Schltr. ex Poelln.) Oberm. endemic

Tulista 
Genus Tulista:
 Tulista aristata (Haw.) G.D.Rowley, accepted as Aristaloe aristata (Haw.) Boatwr. & J.C.Manning, indigenous
 Tulista bullulata (Jacq.) G.D.Rowley, accepted as Astroloba bullulata (Jacq.) Uitewaal, endemic
 Tulista congesta (Salm-Dyck) G.D.Rowley, accepted as Astroloba congesta (Salm-Dyck) Uitewaal, indigenous
 Tulista corrugata (N.L.Mey. & Gideon F.Sm.) G.D.Rowley, accepted as Astroloba corrugata N.L.Mey. & Gideon F.Sm. endemic
 Tulista foliolosa (Haw.) G.D.Rowley, accepted as Astroloba foliolosa (Haw.) Uitewaal, endemic
 Tulista herrei (Uitewaal) G.D.Rowley, accepted as Astroloba herrei Uitewaal, endemic
 Tulista kingiana (Poelln.) Breuer, accepted as Tulista kingiana (Poelln.) Gideon F.Sm. & Molteno, endemic
 Tulista kingiana (Poelln.) G.D.Rowley, accepted as Tulista kingiana (Poelln.) Gideon F.Sm. & Molteno, endemic
 Tulista kingiana (Poelln.) Gideon F.Sm. & Molteno, endemic
 Tulista koelmaniorum (Oberm. & D.S.Hardy) G.D.Rowley, accepted as Haworthiopsis koelmaniorum (Oberm. & D.S.Hardy) Boatwr. & J.C.Manning, endemic
 Tulista koelmaniorum (Oberm. & D.S.Hardy) G.D.Rowley var. mcmurtryi (C.L.Scott) G.D.Rowley, accepted as Haworthiopsis koelmaniorum (Oberm. & D.S.Hardy) Boatwr. & J.C.Manning var. mcmurtryi (C.L.Scott) Gil, endemic
 Tulista margaritifera Raf. accepted as Tulista pumila (L.) G.D.Rowley, endemic
 Tulista marginata (Lam.) G.D.Rowley, endemic
 Tulista minima (Aiton) Boatwr. & J.C.Manning, accepted as Tulista minor (Aiton) Gideon F.Sm. & Molteno, endemic
 Tulista minima (Aiton) Boatwr. & J.C.Manning var. poellnitziana (Uitewaal) Breuer, accepted as Tulista minor (Aiton) Gideon F.Sm. & Molteno, endemic
 Tulista minor (Aiton) Gideon F.Sm. & Molteno, endemic
 Tulista opalina (M.Hayashi) Breuer, accepted as Tulista minor (Aiton) Gideon F.Sm. & Molteno, endemic
 Tulista opalina (M.Hayashi) Breuer var. zenigata (M.Hayashi) Breuer, accepted as Tulista kingiana (Poelln.) Gideon F.Sm. & Molteno, endemic
 Tulista pumila (L.) G.D.Rowley, endemic
 Tulista pumila (L.) G.D.Rowley var. okhuwae (M.Hayashi) Breuer, accepted as Tulista pumila (L.) G.D.Rowley, endemic
 Tulista pumila (L.) G.D.Rowley var. sparsa (M.Hayashi) Breuer, accepted as Tulista pumila (L.) G.D.Rowley, endemic
 Tulista pungens (M.B.Bayer) G.D.Rowley, accepted as Haworthiopsis pungens (M.B.Bayer) Boatwr. & J.C.Manning, endemic
 Tulista rubriflora (L.Bolus) G.D.Rowley, accepted as Astroloba rubriflora (L.Bolus) Gideon F.Sm. & J.C.Manning, endemic
 Tulista spiralis (L.) G.D.Rowley, accepted as Astroloba spiralis (L.) Uitewaal, endemic
 Tulista variegata (L.) G.D.Rowley, accepted as Gonialoe variegata (L.) Boatwr. & J.C.Manning, indigenous
 Tulista viscosa (L.) G.D.Rowley, accepted as Haworthiopsis viscosa (L.) Gildenh. & Klopper, endemic

Hybrids 
 Tulista × bicarinata (Haw.) G.D.Rowley, accepted as × Astrolista bicarinata (Haw.) Molteno & Figueiredo, endemic
 × Astrolista bicarinata (Haw.) Molteno & Figueiredo, endemic
 × Astroworthia bicarinata (Haw.) G.D.Rowley, accepted as × Astrolista bicarinata (Haw.) Molteno & Figueiredo, endemic
 × Astroworthia bicarinata (Haw.) G.D.Rowley var. skinneri (A.Berger) G.D.Rowley, accepted as × Astrolista bicarinata (Haw.) Molteno & Figueiredo, endemic
 × Astroworthia skinneri (A.Berger) L.E.Groen, accepted as × Astrolista bicarinata (Haw.) Molteno & Figueiredo, endemic

References

South African plant biodiversity lists
Asphodelaceae